

193001–193100 

|-bgcolor=#d6d6d6
| 193001 ||  || — || February 27, 2000 || Kitt Peak || Spacewatch || — || align=right | 3.0 km || 
|-id=002 bgcolor=#d6d6d6
| 193002 ||  || — || February 25, 2000 || Kitt Peak || Spacewatch || — || align=right | 5.3 km || 
|-id=003 bgcolor=#d6d6d6
| 193003 ||  || — || March 3, 2000 || Socorro || LINEAR || — || align=right | 3.2 km || 
|-id=004 bgcolor=#d6d6d6
| 193004 ||  || — || March 2, 2000 || Kitt Peak || Spacewatch || — || align=right | 4.5 km || 
|-id=005 bgcolor=#d6d6d6
| 193005 ||  || — || March 2, 2000 || Kitt Peak || Spacewatch || — || align=right | 3.7 km || 
|-id=006 bgcolor=#fefefe
| 193006 ||  || — || March 3, 2000 || Socorro || LINEAR || — || align=right | 1.3 km || 
|-id=007 bgcolor=#d6d6d6
| 193007 ||  || — || March 4, 2000 || Socorro || LINEAR || EUP || align=right | 6.7 km || 
|-id=008 bgcolor=#fefefe
| 193008 ||  || — || March 3, 2000 || Socorro || LINEAR || — || align=right | 1.1 km || 
|-id=009 bgcolor=#d6d6d6
| 193009 ||  || — || March 4, 2000 || Socorro || LINEAR || — || align=right | 3.6 km || 
|-id=010 bgcolor=#E9E9E9
| 193010 ||  || — || March 4, 2000 || Socorro || LINEAR || GEF || align=right | 2.2 km || 
|-id=011 bgcolor=#d6d6d6
| 193011 ||  || — || March 5, 2000 || Socorro || LINEAR || TIR || align=right | 6.3 km || 
|-id=012 bgcolor=#d6d6d6
| 193012 ||  || — || March 8, 2000 || Kitt Peak || Spacewatch || — || align=right | 4.3 km || 
|-id=013 bgcolor=#fefefe
| 193013 ||  || — || March 8, 2000 || Socorro || LINEAR || — || align=right | 2.0 km || 
|-id=014 bgcolor=#fefefe
| 193014 ||  || — || March 5, 2000 || Socorro || LINEAR || FLO || align=right | 3.6 km || 
|-id=015 bgcolor=#d6d6d6
| 193015 ||  || — || March 8, 2000 || Socorro || LINEAR || — || align=right | 4.2 km || 
|-id=016 bgcolor=#d6d6d6
| 193016 ||  || — || March 8, 2000 || Socorro || LINEAR || THB || align=right | 6.5 km || 
|-id=017 bgcolor=#d6d6d6
| 193017 ||  || — || March 8, 2000 || Socorro || LINEAR || — || align=right | 5.1 km || 
|-id=018 bgcolor=#d6d6d6
| 193018 ||  || — || March 8, 2000 || Socorro || LINEAR || — || align=right | 7.1 km || 
|-id=019 bgcolor=#fefefe
| 193019 ||  || — || March 8, 2000 || Socorro || LINEAR || — || align=right | 1.4 km || 
|-id=020 bgcolor=#d6d6d6
| 193020 ||  || — || March 3, 2000 || Kitt Peak || Spacewatch || EOS || align=right | 3.2 km || 
|-id=021 bgcolor=#fefefe
| 193021 ||  || — || March 3, 2000 || Kitt Peak || Spacewatch || — || align=right | 1.3 km || 
|-id=022 bgcolor=#d6d6d6
| 193022 ||  || — || March 8, 2000 || Socorro || LINEAR || YAK || align=right | 5.5 km || 
|-id=023 bgcolor=#d6d6d6
| 193023 ||  || — || March 8, 2000 || Socorro || LINEAR || — || align=right | 5.1 km || 
|-id=024 bgcolor=#fefefe
| 193024 ||  || — || March 10, 2000 || Socorro || LINEAR || — || align=right | 1.5 km || 
|-id=025 bgcolor=#d6d6d6
| 193025 ||  || — || March 10, 2000 || Socorro || LINEAR || — || align=right | 3.5 km || 
|-id=026 bgcolor=#d6d6d6
| 193026 ||  || — || March 10, 2000 || Socorro || LINEAR || — || align=right | 4.7 km || 
|-id=027 bgcolor=#d6d6d6
| 193027 ||  || — || March 10, 2000 || Socorro || LINEAR || — || align=right | 3.4 km || 
|-id=028 bgcolor=#d6d6d6
| 193028 ||  || — || March 10, 2000 || Catalina || CSS || — || align=right | 3.9 km || 
|-id=029 bgcolor=#d6d6d6
| 193029 ||  || — || March 10, 2000 || Kitt Peak || Spacewatch || — || align=right | 4.1 km || 
|-id=030 bgcolor=#d6d6d6
| 193030 ||  || — || March 11, 2000 || Kitt Peak || Spacewatch || THM || align=right | 3.5 km || 
|-id=031 bgcolor=#fefefe
| 193031 ||  || — || March 5, 2000 || Socorro || LINEAR || FLO || align=right | 1.4 km || 
|-id=032 bgcolor=#fefefe
| 193032 ||  || — || March 5, 2000 || Socorro || LINEAR || FLO || align=right | 1.8 km || 
|-id=033 bgcolor=#E9E9E9
| 193033 ||  || — || March 9, 2000 || Socorro || LINEAR || — || align=right | 5.2 km || 
|-id=034 bgcolor=#fefefe
| 193034 ||  || — || March 10, 2000 || Kitt Peak || Spacewatch || — || align=right | 1.3 km || 
|-id=035 bgcolor=#d6d6d6
| 193035 ||  || — || March 11, 2000 || Anderson Mesa || LONEOS || — || align=right | 3.1 km || 
|-id=036 bgcolor=#fefefe
| 193036 ||  || — || March 11, 2000 || Anderson Mesa || LONEOS || — || align=right | 1.5 km || 
|-id=037 bgcolor=#d6d6d6
| 193037 ||  || — || March 11, 2000 || Anderson Mesa || LONEOS || — || align=right | 4.6 km || 
|-id=038 bgcolor=#fefefe
| 193038 ||  || — || March 11, 2000 || Anderson Mesa || LONEOS || FLO || align=right | 1.1 km || 
|-id=039 bgcolor=#d6d6d6
| 193039 ||  || — || March 11, 2000 || Anderson Mesa || LONEOS || EOS || align=right | 3.4 km || 
|-id=040 bgcolor=#d6d6d6
| 193040 ||  || — || March 3, 2000 || Socorro || LINEAR || URS || align=right | 4.4 km || 
|-id=041 bgcolor=#d6d6d6
| 193041 ||  || — || March 3, 2000 || Socorro || LINEAR || HYG || align=right | 4.2 km || 
|-id=042 bgcolor=#fefefe
| 193042 ||  || — || March 3, 2000 || Socorro || LINEAR || — || align=right | 1.8 km || 
|-id=043 bgcolor=#d6d6d6
| 193043 ||  || — || March 4, 2000 || Socorro || LINEAR || — || align=right | 5.6 km || 
|-id=044 bgcolor=#fefefe
| 193044 ||  || — || March 25, 2000 || Kitt Peak || Spacewatch || — || align=right data-sort-value="0.87" | 870 m || 
|-id=045 bgcolor=#fefefe
| 193045 ||  || — || March 25, 2000 || Kitt Peak || Spacewatch || — || align=right | 1.3 km || 
|-id=046 bgcolor=#d6d6d6
| 193046 ||  || — || March 29, 2000 || Kitt Peak || Spacewatch || — || align=right | 3.8 km || 
|-id=047 bgcolor=#d6d6d6
| 193047 ||  || — || March 28, 2000 || Socorro || LINEAR || — || align=right | 8.3 km || 
|-id=048 bgcolor=#fefefe
| 193048 ||  || — || March 29, 2000 || Socorro || LINEAR || PHO || align=right | 2.3 km || 
|-id=049 bgcolor=#d6d6d6
| 193049 ||  || — || March 27, 2000 || Anderson Mesa || LONEOS || — || align=right | 4.8 km || 
|-id=050 bgcolor=#d6d6d6
| 193050 ||  || — || March 27, 2000 || Anderson Mesa || LONEOS || — || align=right | 5.4 km || 
|-id=051 bgcolor=#fefefe
| 193051 ||  || — || March 27, 2000 || Anderson Mesa || LONEOS || — || align=right | 1.2 km || 
|-id=052 bgcolor=#fefefe
| 193052 ||  || — || March 29, 2000 || Socorro || LINEAR || V || align=right | 1.0 km || 
|-id=053 bgcolor=#fefefe
| 193053 ||  || — || March 29, 2000 || Socorro || LINEAR || FLO || align=right | 1.6 km || 
|-id=054 bgcolor=#d6d6d6
| 193054 ||  || — || March 29, 2000 || Socorro || LINEAR || — || align=right | 6.7 km || 
|-id=055 bgcolor=#fefefe
| 193055 ||  || — || March 29, 2000 || Socorro || LINEAR || ERI || align=right | 3.3 km || 
|-id=056 bgcolor=#fefefe
| 193056 ||  || — || March 29, 2000 || Kitt Peak || Spacewatch || NYS || align=right data-sort-value="0.96" | 960 m || 
|-id=057 bgcolor=#fefefe
| 193057 ||  || — || March 29, 2000 || Kitt Peak || Spacewatch || MAS || align=right data-sort-value="0.97" | 970 m || 
|-id=058 bgcolor=#d6d6d6
| 193058 ||  || — || March 29, 2000 || Socorro || LINEAR || — || align=right | 7.8 km || 
|-id=059 bgcolor=#d6d6d6
| 193059 ||  || — || March 25, 2000 || Kitt Peak || Spacewatch || — || align=right | 5.3 km || 
|-id=060 bgcolor=#fefefe
| 193060 || 2000 GL || — || April 2, 2000 || Prescott || P. G. Comba || — || align=right | 1.7 km || 
|-id=061 bgcolor=#d6d6d6
| 193061 || 2000 GP || — || April 1, 2000 || Kitt Peak || Spacewatch || — || align=right | 3.4 km || 
|-id=062 bgcolor=#d6d6d6
| 193062 ||  || — || April 4, 2000 || Socorro || LINEAR || — || align=right | 3.0 km || 
|-id=063 bgcolor=#d6d6d6
| 193063 ||  || — || April 4, 2000 || Socorro || LINEAR || — || align=right | 5.2 km || 
|-id=064 bgcolor=#fefefe
| 193064 ||  || — || April 5, 2000 || Socorro || LINEAR || — || align=right | 1.1 km || 
|-id=065 bgcolor=#d6d6d6
| 193065 ||  || — || April 5, 2000 || Socorro || LINEAR || HYG || align=right | 5.0 km || 
|-id=066 bgcolor=#d6d6d6
| 193066 ||  || — || April 5, 2000 || Socorro || LINEAR || EOS || align=right | 2.8 km || 
|-id=067 bgcolor=#d6d6d6
| 193067 ||  || — || April 5, 2000 || Socorro || LINEAR || THM || align=right | 4.0 km || 
|-id=068 bgcolor=#fefefe
| 193068 ||  || — || April 5, 2000 || Socorro || LINEAR || — || align=right | 1.5 km || 
|-id=069 bgcolor=#fefefe
| 193069 ||  || — || April 5, 2000 || Socorro || LINEAR || MAS || align=right | 1.1 km || 
|-id=070 bgcolor=#fefefe
| 193070 ||  || — || April 5, 2000 || Socorro || LINEAR || — || align=right | 1.0 km || 
|-id=071 bgcolor=#d6d6d6
| 193071 ||  || — || April 5, 2000 || Socorro || LINEAR || — || align=right | 4.4 km || 
|-id=072 bgcolor=#fefefe
| 193072 ||  || — || April 5, 2000 || Socorro || LINEAR || NYS || align=right data-sort-value="0.83" | 830 m || 
|-id=073 bgcolor=#fefefe
| 193073 ||  || — || April 5, 2000 || Socorro || LINEAR || ERI || align=right | 1.7 km || 
|-id=074 bgcolor=#d6d6d6
| 193074 ||  || — || April 5, 2000 || Socorro || LINEAR || — || align=right | 6.4 km || 
|-id=075 bgcolor=#fefefe
| 193075 ||  || — || April 5, 2000 || Socorro || LINEAR || EUT || align=right data-sort-value="0.97" | 970 m || 
|-id=076 bgcolor=#d6d6d6
| 193076 ||  || — || April 5, 2000 || Socorro || LINEAR || THM || align=right | 3.4 km || 
|-id=077 bgcolor=#fefefe
| 193077 ||  || — || April 5, 2000 || Socorro || LINEAR || — || align=right data-sort-value="0.91" | 910 m || 
|-id=078 bgcolor=#fefefe
| 193078 ||  || — || April 5, 2000 || Socorro || LINEAR || FLO || align=right data-sort-value="0.94" | 940 m || 
|-id=079 bgcolor=#d6d6d6
| 193079 ||  || — || April 5, 2000 || Socorro || LINEAR || — || align=right | 3.6 km || 
|-id=080 bgcolor=#d6d6d6
| 193080 ||  || — || April 5, 2000 || Socorro || LINEAR || — || align=right | 5.1 km || 
|-id=081 bgcolor=#fefefe
| 193081 ||  || — || April 5, 2000 || Socorro || LINEAR || — || align=right data-sort-value="0.78" | 780 m || 
|-id=082 bgcolor=#fefefe
| 193082 ||  || — || April 5, 2000 || Socorro || LINEAR || MAS || align=right | 1.1 km || 
|-id=083 bgcolor=#fefefe
| 193083 ||  || — || April 5, 2000 || Socorro || LINEAR || — || align=right | 1.9 km || 
|-id=084 bgcolor=#fefefe
| 193084 ||  || — || April 5, 2000 || Socorro || LINEAR || — || align=right | 1.3 km || 
|-id=085 bgcolor=#d6d6d6
| 193085 ||  || — || April 5, 2000 || Socorro || LINEAR || — || align=right | 3.4 km || 
|-id=086 bgcolor=#fefefe
| 193086 ||  || — || April 5, 2000 || Socorro || LINEAR || — || align=right | 1.5 km || 
|-id=087 bgcolor=#d6d6d6
| 193087 ||  || — || April 5, 2000 || Socorro || LINEAR || — || align=right | 6.3 km || 
|-id=088 bgcolor=#d6d6d6
| 193088 ||  || — || April 5, 2000 || Socorro || LINEAR || — || align=right | 5.5 km || 
|-id=089 bgcolor=#d6d6d6
| 193089 ||  || — || April 5, 2000 || Socorro || LINEAR || — || align=right | 6.2 km || 
|-id=090 bgcolor=#fefefe
| 193090 ||  || — || April 6, 2000 || Socorro || LINEAR || FLO || align=right data-sort-value="0.89" | 890 m || 
|-id=091 bgcolor=#d6d6d6
| 193091 ||  || — || April 6, 2000 || Socorro || LINEAR || — || align=right | 4.5 km || 
|-id=092 bgcolor=#fefefe
| 193092 ||  || — || April 7, 2000 || Socorro || LINEAR || — || align=right | 1.3 km || 
|-id=093 bgcolor=#d6d6d6
| 193093 ||  || — || April 7, 2000 || Socorro || LINEAR || — || align=right | 4.6 km || 
|-id=094 bgcolor=#fefefe
| 193094 ||  || — || April 2, 2000 || Anderson Mesa || LONEOS || — || align=right | 1.1 km || 
|-id=095 bgcolor=#fefefe
| 193095 ||  || — || April 3, 2000 || Anderson Mesa || LONEOS || — || align=right | 1.4 km || 
|-id=096 bgcolor=#fefefe
| 193096 ||  || — || April 5, 2000 || Socorro || LINEAR || — || align=right data-sort-value="0.98" | 980 m || 
|-id=097 bgcolor=#fefefe
| 193097 ||  || — || April 8, 2000 || Socorro || LINEAR || — || align=right | 2.5 km || 
|-id=098 bgcolor=#d6d6d6
| 193098 ||  || — || April 3, 2000 || Kitt Peak || Spacewatch || — || align=right | 3.8 km || 
|-id=099 bgcolor=#fefefe
| 193099 ||  || — || April 5, 2000 || Kitt Peak || Spacewatch || — || align=right | 1.0 km || 
|-id=100 bgcolor=#fefefe
| 193100 ||  || — || April 6, 2000 || Kitt Peak || Spacewatch || — || align=right data-sort-value="0.91" | 910 m || 
|}

193101–193200 

|-bgcolor=#fefefe
| 193101 ||  || — || April 6, 2000 || Kitt Peak || Spacewatch || — || align=right data-sort-value="0.89" | 890 m || 
|-id=102 bgcolor=#d6d6d6
| 193102 ||  || — || April 6, 2000 || Kitt Peak || Spacewatch || — || align=right | 3.8 km || 
|-id=103 bgcolor=#fefefe
| 193103 ||  || — || April 11, 2000 || Prescott || P. G. Comba || EUT || align=right | 1.0 km || 
|-id=104 bgcolor=#fefefe
| 193104 ||  || — || April 5, 2000 || Kitt Peak || Spacewatch || — || align=right | 1.1 km || 
|-id=105 bgcolor=#fefefe
| 193105 ||  || — || April 7, 2000 || Kitt Peak || Spacewatch || — || align=right | 1.2 km || 
|-id=106 bgcolor=#fefefe
| 193106 ||  || — || April 8, 2000 || Socorro || LINEAR || PHO || align=right | 1.7 km || 
|-id=107 bgcolor=#d6d6d6
| 193107 ||  || — || April 8, 2000 || Socorro || LINEAR || — || align=right | 6.1 km || 
|-id=108 bgcolor=#d6d6d6
| 193108 ||  || — || April 4, 2000 || Anderson Mesa || LONEOS || ALA || align=right | 6.1 km || 
|-id=109 bgcolor=#d6d6d6
| 193109 ||  || — || April 5, 2000 || Socorro || LINEAR || — || align=right | 5.1 km || 
|-id=110 bgcolor=#d6d6d6
| 193110 ||  || — || April 6, 2000 || Socorro || LINEAR || — || align=right | 4.5 km || 
|-id=111 bgcolor=#fefefe
| 193111 ||  || — || April 6, 2000 || Anderson Mesa || LONEOS || FLO || align=right data-sort-value="0.98" | 980 m || 
|-id=112 bgcolor=#d6d6d6
| 193112 ||  || — || April 6, 2000 || Anderson Mesa || LONEOS || URS || align=right | 5.5 km || 
|-id=113 bgcolor=#d6d6d6
| 193113 ||  || — || April 7, 2000 || Socorro || LINEAR || EUP || align=right | 7.9 km || 
|-id=114 bgcolor=#d6d6d6
| 193114 ||  || — || April 5, 2000 || Socorro || LINEAR || — || align=right | 4.8 km || 
|-id=115 bgcolor=#fefefe
| 193115 ||  || — || April 5, 2000 || Anderson Mesa || LONEOS || FLO || align=right data-sort-value="0.97" | 970 m || 
|-id=116 bgcolor=#d6d6d6
| 193116 ||  || — || April 5, 2000 || Anderson Mesa || LONEOS || — || align=right | 6.2 km || 
|-id=117 bgcolor=#d6d6d6
| 193117 ||  || — || April 3, 2000 || Kitt Peak || Spacewatch || THM || align=right | 4.7 km || 
|-id=118 bgcolor=#d6d6d6
| 193118 || 2000 HJ || — || April 24, 2000 || Kitt Peak || Spacewatch || — || align=right | 4.5 km || 
|-id=119 bgcolor=#fefefe
| 193119 || 2000 HT || — || April 24, 2000 || Kitt Peak || Spacewatch || — || align=right | 1.2 km || 
|-id=120 bgcolor=#fefefe
| 193120 ||  || — || April 26, 2000 || Kitt Peak || Spacewatch || V || align=right data-sort-value="0.83" | 830 m || 
|-id=121 bgcolor=#d6d6d6
| 193121 ||  || — || April 28, 2000 || Kitt Peak || Spacewatch || — || align=right | 5.9 km || 
|-id=122 bgcolor=#d6d6d6
| 193122 ||  || — || April 27, 2000 || Socorro || LINEAR || — || align=right | 4.6 km || 
|-id=123 bgcolor=#fefefe
| 193123 ||  || — || April 27, 2000 || Socorro || LINEAR || — || align=right | 1.1 km || 
|-id=124 bgcolor=#fefefe
| 193124 ||  || — || April 29, 2000 || Socorro || LINEAR || — || align=right data-sort-value="0.83" | 830 m || 
|-id=125 bgcolor=#fefefe
| 193125 ||  || — || April 24, 2000 || Anderson Mesa || LONEOS || NYS || align=right data-sort-value="0.75" | 750 m || 
|-id=126 bgcolor=#fefefe
| 193126 ||  || — || April 24, 2000 || Anderson Mesa || LONEOS || NYS || align=right | 1.1 km || 
|-id=127 bgcolor=#fefefe
| 193127 ||  || — || April 24, 2000 || Anderson Mesa || LONEOS || — || align=right data-sort-value="0.89" | 890 m || 
|-id=128 bgcolor=#d6d6d6
| 193128 ||  || — || April 24, 2000 || Anderson Mesa || LONEOS || — || align=right | 4.2 km || 
|-id=129 bgcolor=#fefefe
| 193129 ||  || — || April 29, 2000 || Socorro || LINEAR || — || align=right | 1.0 km || 
|-id=130 bgcolor=#fefefe
| 193130 ||  || — || April 29, 2000 || Kitt Peak || Spacewatch || MAS || align=right data-sort-value="0.79" | 790 m || 
|-id=131 bgcolor=#fefefe
| 193131 ||  || — || April 26, 2000 || Anderson Mesa || LONEOS || — || align=right | 1.2 km || 
|-id=132 bgcolor=#d6d6d6
| 193132 ||  || — || April 29, 2000 || Socorro || LINEAR || HYG || align=right | 4.1 km || 
|-id=133 bgcolor=#fefefe
| 193133 ||  || — || April 29, 2000 || Socorro || LINEAR || — || align=right | 1.3 km || 
|-id=134 bgcolor=#d6d6d6
| 193134 ||  || — || April 24, 2000 || Anderson Mesa || LONEOS || — || align=right | 3.0 km || 
|-id=135 bgcolor=#fefefe
| 193135 ||  || — || April 25, 2000 || Anderson Mesa || LONEOS || FLO || align=right data-sort-value="0.84" | 840 m || 
|-id=136 bgcolor=#d6d6d6
| 193136 ||  || — || April 25, 2000 || Kitt Peak || Spacewatch || — || align=right | 5.2 km || 
|-id=137 bgcolor=#fefefe
| 193137 ||  || — || April 25, 2000 || Kitt Peak || Spacewatch || NYS || align=right data-sort-value="0.79" | 790 m || 
|-id=138 bgcolor=#fefefe
| 193138 ||  || — || April 25, 2000 || Kitt Peak || Spacewatch || — || align=right | 1.2 km || 
|-id=139 bgcolor=#fefefe
| 193139 ||  || — || April 26, 2000 || Anderson Mesa || LONEOS || MAS || align=right data-sort-value="0.96" | 960 m || 
|-id=140 bgcolor=#d6d6d6
| 193140 ||  || — || April 27, 2000 || Anderson Mesa || LONEOS || EOS || align=right | 3.4 km || 
|-id=141 bgcolor=#d6d6d6
| 193141 ||  || — || April 28, 2000 || Kitt Peak || Spacewatch || THM || align=right | 4.5 km || 
|-id=142 bgcolor=#fefefe
| 193142 ||  || — || April 26, 2000 || Anderson Mesa || LONEOS || — || align=right | 1.0 km || 
|-id=143 bgcolor=#fefefe
| 193143 ||  || — || April 29, 2000 || Socorro || LINEAR || NYS || align=right data-sort-value="0.81" | 810 m || 
|-id=144 bgcolor=#fefefe
| 193144 ||  || — || April 29, 2000 || Socorro || LINEAR || — || align=right | 1.4 km || 
|-id=145 bgcolor=#d6d6d6
| 193145 ||  || — || April 29, 2000 || Socorro || LINEAR || HYG || align=right | 3.9 km || 
|-id=146 bgcolor=#fefefe
| 193146 ||  || — || April 26, 2000 || Anderson Mesa || LONEOS || FLO || align=right data-sort-value="0.93" | 930 m || 
|-id=147 bgcolor=#fefefe
| 193147 ||  || — || April 27, 2000 || Anderson Mesa || LONEOS || — || align=right | 1.3 km || 
|-id=148 bgcolor=#fefefe
| 193148 ||  || — || May 4, 2000 || Socorro || LINEAR || — || align=right | 1.6 km || 
|-id=149 bgcolor=#fefefe
| 193149 ||  || — || May 3, 2000 || Kitt Peak || Spacewatch || — || align=right | 1.7 km || 
|-id=150 bgcolor=#fefefe
| 193150 ||  || — || May 7, 2000 || Prescott || P. G. Comba || NYS || align=right data-sort-value="0.93" | 930 m || 
|-id=151 bgcolor=#fefefe
| 193151 ||  || — || May 6, 2000 || Socorro || LINEAR || FLO || align=right data-sort-value="0.84" | 840 m || 
|-id=152 bgcolor=#fefefe
| 193152 ||  || — || May 7, 2000 || Socorro || LINEAR || — || align=right | 1.4 km || 
|-id=153 bgcolor=#d6d6d6
| 193153 ||  || — || May 7, 2000 || Socorro || LINEAR || — || align=right | 4.1 km || 
|-id=154 bgcolor=#d6d6d6
| 193154 ||  || — || May 7, 2000 || Socorro || LINEAR || — || align=right | 4.5 km || 
|-id=155 bgcolor=#fefefe
| 193155 ||  || — || May 7, 2000 || Socorro || LINEAR || EUT || align=right data-sort-value="0.98" | 980 m || 
|-id=156 bgcolor=#fefefe
| 193156 ||  || — || May 10, 2000 || Socorro || LINEAR || — || align=right | 1.2 km || 
|-id=157 bgcolor=#fefefe
| 193157 ||  || — || May 7, 2000 || Socorro || LINEAR || ERI || align=right | 2.1 km || 
|-id=158 bgcolor=#d6d6d6
| 193158 Haechan ||  ||  || May 28, 2000 || Bohyunsan || S.-L. Kim || — || align=right | 4.6 km || 
|-id=159 bgcolor=#fefefe
| 193159 ||  || — || May 27, 2000 || Socorro || LINEAR || — || align=right | 1.2 km || 
|-id=160 bgcolor=#fefefe
| 193160 ||  || — || May 28, 2000 || Socorro || LINEAR || NYS || align=right | 1.1 km || 
|-id=161 bgcolor=#fefefe
| 193161 ||  || — || May 28, 2000 || Socorro || LINEAR || FLO || align=right data-sort-value="0.92" | 920 m || 
|-id=162 bgcolor=#d6d6d6
| 193162 ||  || — || May 28, 2000 || Socorro || LINEAR || THM || align=right | 5.0 km || 
|-id=163 bgcolor=#d6d6d6
| 193163 ||  || — || May 28, 2000 || Socorro || LINEAR || — || align=right | 4.4 km || 
|-id=164 bgcolor=#d6d6d6
| 193164 ||  || — || May 28, 2000 || Socorro || LINEAR || — || align=right | 5.7 km || 
|-id=165 bgcolor=#fefefe
| 193165 ||  || — || May 28, 2000 || Socorro || LINEAR || NYS || align=right data-sort-value="0.88" | 880 m || 
|-id=166 bgcolor=#fefefe
| 193166 ||  || — || May 28, 2000 || Socorro || LINEAR || — || align=right | 1.3 km || 
|-id=167 bgcolor=#fefefe
| 193167 ||  || — || May 31, 2000 || Prescott || P. G. Comba || MAS || align=right | 1.3 km || 
|-id=168 bgcolor=#fefefe
| 193168 ||  || — || May 25, 2000 || Kitt Peak || Spacewatch || V || align=right data-sort-value="0.95" | 950 m || 
|-id=169 bgcolor=#d6d6d6
| 193169 ||  || — || May 30, 2000 || Kitt Peak || Spacewatch || — || align=right | 6.4 km || 
|-id=170 bgcolor=#d6d6d6
| 193170 ||  || — || May 30, 2000 || Kitt Peak || Spacewatch || — || align=right | 4.2 km || 
|-id=171 bgcolor=#d6d6d6
| 193171 ||  || — || May 31, 2000 || Kitt Peak || Spacewatch || — || align=right | 4.7 km || 
|-id=172 bgcolor=#fefefe
| 193172 ||  || — || June 7, 2000 || Prescott || P. G. Comba || — || align=right | 1.2 km || 
|-id=173 bgcolor=#fefefe
| 193173 ||  || — || June 5, 2000 || Socorro || LINEAR || — || align=right | 1.2 km || 
|-id=174 bgcolor=#d6d6d6
| 193174 ||  || — || June 6, 2000 || Kitt Peak || Spacewatch || — || align=right | 4.7 km || 
|-id=175 bgcolor=#fefefe
| 193175 ||  || — || July 30, 2000 || Socorro || LINEAR || — || align=right | 3.9 km || 
|-id=176 bgcolor=#fefefe
| 193176 ||  || — || July 23, 2000 || Socorro || LINEAR || — || align=right | 2.0 km || 
|-id=177 bgcolor=#d6d6d6
| 193177 ||  || — || July 23, 2000 || Socorro || LINEAR || — || align=right | 5.9 km || 
|-id=178 bgcolor=#FFC2E0
| 193178 ||  || — || August 4, 2000 || Socorro || LINEAR || APO +1km || align=right | 1.0 km || 
|-id=179 bgcolor=#fefefe
| 193179 ||  || — || August 1, 2000 || Socorro || LINEAR || NYS || align=right | 3.3 km || 
|-id=180 bgcolor=#fefefe
| 193180 ||  || — || August 4, 2000 || Socorro || LINEAR || H || align=right data-sort-value="0.82" | 820 m || 
|-id=181 bgcolor=#fefefe
| 193181 ||  || — || August 4, 2000 || Haleakala || NEAT || — || align=right | 1.9 km || 
|-id=182 bgcolor=#fefefe
| 193182 || 2000 QR || — || August 22, 2000 || Drebach || G. Lehmann || NYS || align=right data-sort-value="0.95" | 950 m || 
|-id=183 bgcolor=#fefefe
| 193183 ||  || — || August 24, 2000 || Socorro || LINEAR || NYS || align=right data-sort-value="0.90" | 900 m || 
|-id=184 bgcolor=#fefefe
| 193184 ||  || — || August 24, 2000 || Socorro || LINEAR || NYS || align=right data-sort-value="0.83" | 830 m || 
|-id=185 bgcolor=#fefefe
| 193185 ||  || — || August 24, 2000 || Socorro || LINEAR || — || align=right | 3.2 km || 
|-id=186 bgcolor=#fefefe
| 193186 ||  || — || August 24, 2000 || Socorro || LINEAR || — || align=right | 1.2 km || 
|-id=187 bgcolor=#fefefe
| 193187 ||  || — || August 24, 2000 || Socorro || LINEAR || MAS || align=right | 1.0 km || 
|-id=188 bgcolor=#fefefe
| 193188 ||  || — || August 26, 2000 || Socorro || LINEAR || — || align=right | 1.0 km || 
|-id=189 bgcolor=#fefefe
| 193189 ||  || — || August 26, 2000 || Socorro || LINEAR || NYS || align=right data-sort-value="0.90" | 900 m || 
|-id=190 bgcolor=#fefefe
| 193190 ||  || — || August 26, 2000 || Socorro || LINEAR || MAS || align=right | 1.1 km || 
|-id=191 bgcolor=#fefefe
| 193191 ||  || — || August 25, 2000 || Socorro || LINEAR || NYS || align=right | 1.1 km || 
|-id=192 bgcolor=#fefefe
| 193192 ||  || — || August 26, 2000 || Socorro || LINEAR || — || align=right | 1.5 km || 
|-id=193 bgcolor=#E9E9E9
| 193193 ||  || — || August 24, 2000 || Socorro || LINEAR || — || align=right | 1.1 km || 
|-id=194 bgcolor=#E9E9E9
| 193194 ||  || — || August 25, 2000 || Socorro || LINEAR || — || align=right | 1.6 km || 
|-id=195 bgcolor=#fefefe
| 193195 ||  || — || August 29, 2000 || Socorro || LINEAR || V || align=right | 1.2 km || 
|-id=196 bgcolor=#fefefe
| 193196 ||  || — || August 31, 2000 || Socorro || LINEAR || — || align=right | 1.5 km || 
|-id=197 bgcolor=#E9E9E9
| 193197 ||  || — || August 30, 2000 || Višnjan Observatory || K. Korlević || — || align=right | 1.7 km || 
|-id=198 bgcolor=#E9E9E9
| 193198 ||  || — || August 31, 2000 || Socorro || LINEAR || — || align=right | 1.2 km || 
|-id=199 bgcolor=#fefefe
| 193199 ||  || — || August 31, 2000 || Socorro || LINEAR || — || align=right | 1.5 km || 
|-id=200 bgcolor=#fefefe
| 193200 ||  || — || August 31, 2000 || Socorro || LINEAR || NYS || align=right | 1.2 km || 
|}

193201–193300 

|-bgcolor=#fefefe
| 193201 ||  || — || August 31, 2000 || Socorro || LINEAR || H || align=right | 1.1 km || 
|-id=202 bgcolor=#fefefe
| 193202 ||  || — || August 31, 2000 || Socorro || LINEAR || — || align=right | 1.4 km || 
|-id=203 bgcolor=#fefefe
| 193203 ||  || — || August 31, 2000 || Socorro || LINEAR || V || align=right | 1.2 km || 
|-id=204 bgcolor=#E9E9E9
| 193204 ||  || — || August 31, 2000 || Socorro || LINEAR || — || align=right | 1.2 km || 
|-id=205 bgcolor=#fefefe
| 193205 ||  || — || August 26, 2000 || Socorro || LINEAR || — || align=right | 1.8 km || 
|-id=206 bgcolor=#fefefe
| 193206 ||  || — || August 31, 2000 || Socorro || LINEAR || — || align=right | 1.1 km || 
|-id=207 bgcolor=#fefefe
| 193207 ||  || — || August 29, 2000 || Socorro || LINEAR || — || align=right | 1.3 km || 
|-id=208 bgcolor=#fefefe
| 193208 ||  || — || August 29, 2000 || Socorro || LINEAR || — || align=right | 3.6 km || 
|-id=209 bgcolor=#E9E9E9
| 193209 ||  || — || August 31, 2000 || Socorro || LINEAR || MAR || align=right | 1.7 km || 
|-id=210 bgcolor=#fefefe
| 193210 ||  || — || August 31, 2000 || Socorro || LINEAR || NYS || align=right | 1.4 km || 
|-id=211 bgcolor=#fefefe
| 193211 ||  || — || August 31, 2000 || Socorro || LINEAR || MAS || align=right | 1.2 km || 
|-id=212 bgcolor=#E9E9E9
| 193212 ||  || — || August 26, 2000 || Socorro || LINEAR || MIT || align=right | 3.1 km || 
|-id=213 bgcolor=#fefefe
| 193213 ||  || — || August 31, 2000 || Socorro || LINEAR || V || align=right | 1.4 km || 
|-id=214 bgcolor=#fefefe
| 193214 ||  || — || August 31, 2000 || Socorro || LINEAR || NYS || align=right | 1.0 km || 
|-id=215 bgcolor=#E9E9E9
| 193215 ||  || — || August 31, 2000 || Bergisch Gladbach || W. Bickel || KAZ || align=right | 1.6 km || 
|-id=216 bgcolor=#fefefe
| 193216 || 2000 RC || — || September 1, 2000 || Socorro || LINEAR || H || align=right data-sort-value="0.91" | 910 m || 
|-id=217 bgcolor=#fefefe
| 193217 ||  || — || September 1, 2000 || Socorro || LINEAR || H || align=right | 1.0 km || 
|-id=218 bgcolor=#fefefe
| 193218 ||  || — || September 1, 2000 || Socorro || LINEAR || — || align=right | 1.6 km || 
|-id=219 bgcolor=#fefefe
| 193219 ||  || — || September 1, 2000 || Socorro || LINEAR || — || align=right | 2.1 km || 
|-id=220 bgcolor=#E9E9E9
| 193220 ||  || — || September 1, 2000 || Socorro || LINEAR || — || align=right | 1.8 km || 
|-id=221 bgcolor=#E9E9E9
| 193221 ||  || — || September 1, 2000 || Socorro || LINEAR || — || align=right | 1.5 km || 
|-id=222 bgcolor=#fefefe
| 193222 ||  || — || September 2, 2000 || Socorro || LINEAR || H || align=right | 1.0 km || 
|-id=223 bgcolor=#E9E9E9
| 193223 ||  || — || September 3, 2000 || Socorro || LINEAR || — || align=right | 1.4 km || 
|-id=224 bgcolor=#E9E9E9
| 193224 ||  || — || September 3, 2000 || Socorro || LINEAR || — || align=right | 1.2 km || 
|-id=225 bgcolor=#fefefe
| 193225 ||  || — || September 3, 2000 || Socorro || LINEAR || NYS || align=right | 3.8 km || 
|-id=226 bgcolor=#fefefe
| 193226 ||  || — || September 5, 2000 || Socorro || LINEAR || — || align=right | 1.9 km || 
|-id=227 bgcolor=#fefefe
| 193227 ||  || — || September 7, 2000 || Kitt Peak || Spacewatch || H || align=right | 1.2 km || 
|-id=228 bgcolor=#fefefe
| 193228 ||  || — || September 7, 2000 || Kitt Peak || Spacewatch || — || align=right | 1.5 km || 
|-id=229 bgcolor=#fefefe
| 193229 ||  || — || September 1, 2000 || Socorro || LINEAR || — || align=right | 1.8 km || 
|-id=230 bgcolor=#E9E9E9
| 193230 ||  || — || September 1, 2000 || Socorro || LINEAR || — || align=right | 1.8 km || 
|-id=231 bgcolor=#fefefe
| 193231 ||  || — || September 1, 2000 || Socorro || LINEAR || — || align=right | 1.9 km || 
|-id=232 bgcolor=#E9E9E9
| 193232 ||  || — || September 3, 2000 || Socorro || LINEAR || — || align=right | 1.4 km || 
|-id=233 bgcolor=#E9E9E9
| 193233 ||  || — || September 5, 2000 || Anderson Mesa || LONEOS || — || align=right | 2.2 km || 
|-id=234 bgcolor=#E9E9E9
| 193234 || 2000 SY || — || September 17, 2000 || Socorro || LINEAR || — || align=right | 5.9 km || 
|-id=235 bgcolor=#FA8072
| 193235 ||  || — || September 20, 2000 || Socorro || LINEAR || — || align=right | 1.8 km || 
|-id=236 bgcolor=#E9E9E9
| 193236 ||  || — || September 22, 2000 || Kitt Peak || Spacewatch || — || align=right | 1.5 km || 
|-id=237 bgcolor=#fefefe
| 193237 ||  || — || September 23, 2000 || Socorro || LINEAR || H || align=right data-sort-value="0.88" | 880 m || 
|-id=238 bgcolor=#fefefe
| 193238 ||  || — || September 24, 2000 || Socorro || LINEAR || H || align=right data-sort-value="0.92" | 920 m || 
|-id=239 bgcolor=#fefefe
| 193239 ||  || — || September 24, 2000 || Socorro || LINEAR || H || align=right | 1.2 km || 
|-id=240 bgcolor=#fefefe
| 193240 ||  || — || September 24, 2000 || Socorro || LINEAR || H || align=right data-sort-value="0.89" | 890 m || 
|-id=241 bgcolor=#d6d6d6
| 193241 ||  || — || September 24, 2000 || Socorro || LINEAR || 3:2 || align=right | 7.7 km || 
|-id=242 bgcolor=#fefefe
| 193242 ||  || — || September 24, 2000 || Socorro || LINEAR || NYS || align=right | 1.0 km || 
|-id=243 bgcolor=#fefefe
| 193243 ||  || — || September 28, 2000 || Socorro || LINEAR || H || align=right | 1.0 km || 
|-id=244 bgcolor=#fefefe
| 193244 ||  || — || September 22, 2000 || Socorro || LINEAR || — || align=right | 1.9 km || 
|-id=245 bgcolor=#E9E9E9
| 193245 ||  || — || September 23, 2000 || Socorro || LINEAR || EUN || align=right | 1.3 km || 
|-id=246 bgcolor=#fefefe
| 193246 ||  || — || September 24, 2000 || Socorro || LINEAR || — || align=right | 1.2 km || 
|-id=247 bgcolor=#fefefe
| 193247 ||  || — || September 24, 2000 || Socorro || LINEAR || — || align=right | 1.4 km || 
|-id=248 bgcolor=#d6d6d6
| 193248 ||  || — || September 24, 2000 || Socorro || LINEAR || HIL3:2 || align=right | 9.6 km || 
|-id=249 bgcolor=#E9E9E9
| 193249 ||  || — || September 24, 2000 || Socorro || LINEAR || — || align=right | 1.8 km || 
|-id=250 bgcolor=#fefefe
| 193250 ||  || — || September 24, 2000 || Socorro || LINEAR || — || align=right | 1.2 km || 
|-id=251 bgcolor=#E9E9E9
| 193251 ||  || — || September 24, 2000 || Socorro || LINEAR || — || align=right | 1.8 km || 
|-id=252 bgcolor=#fefefe
| 193252 ||  || — || September 24, 2000 || Socorro || LINEAR || — || align=right | 1.2 km || 
|-id=253 bgcolor=#fefefe
| 193253 ||  || — || September 24, 2000 || Socorro || LINEAR || NYS || align=right data-sort-value="0.88" | 880 m || 
|-id=254 bgcolor=#fefefe
| 193254 ||  || — || September 24, 2000 || Socorro || LINEAR || — || align=right | 1.3 km || 
|-id=255 bgcolor=#E9E9E9
| 193255 ||  || — || September 24, 2000 || Socorro || LINEAR || — || align=right | 2.3 km || 
|-id=256 bgcolor=#fefefe
| 193256 ||  || — || September 24, 2000 || Socorro || LINEAR || — || align=right | 1.5 km || 
|-id=257 bgcolor=#E9E9E9
| 193257 ||  || — || September 24, 2000 || Socorro || LINEAR || — || align=right | 1.6 km || 
|-id=258 bgcolor=#E9E9E9
| 193258 ||  || — || September 24, 2000 || Socorro || LINEAR || — || align=right | 1.5 km || 
|-id=259 bgcolor=#E9E9E9
| 193259 ||  || — || September 24, 2000 || Socorro || LINEAR || — || align=right | 2.3 km || 
|-id=260 bgcolor=#E9E9E9
| 193260 ||  || — || September 24, 2000 || Socorro || LINEAR || — || align=right | 2.2 km || 
|-id=261 bgcolor=#E9E9E9
| 193261 ||  || — || September 24, 2000 || Socorro || LINEAR || — || align=right | 1.2 km || 
|-id=262 bgcolor=#E9E9E9
| 193262 ||  || — || September 24, 2000 || Socorro || LINEAR || — || align=right | 2.5 km || 
|-id=263 bgcolor=#E9E9E9
| 193263 ||  || — || September 24, 2000 || Socorro || LINEAR || — || align=right | 2.2 km || 
|-id=264 bgcolor=#fefefe
| 193264 ||  || — || September 24, 2000 || Socorro || LINEAR || — || align=right | 1.6 km || 
|-id=265 bgcolor=#E9E9E9
| 193265 ||  || — || September 27, 2000 || Kitt Peak || Spacewatch || — || align=right | 1.1 km || 
|-id=266 bgcolor=#fefefe
| 193266 ||  || — || September 30, 2000 || Ondřejov || P. Kušnirák, P. Pravec || NYS || align=right | 1.2 km || 
|-id=267 bgcolor=#E9E9E9
| 193267 ||  || — || September 27, 2000 || Socorro || LINEAR || — || align=right | 2.8 km || 
|-id=268 bgcolor=#d6d6d6
| 193268 ||  || — || September 28, 2000 || Socorro || LINEAR || 3:2 || align=right | 8.5 km || 
|-id=269 bgcolor=#E9E9E9
| 193269 ||  || — || September 28, 2000 || Socorro || LINEAR || EUN || align=right | 2.1 km || 
|-id=270 bgcolor=#E9E9E9
| 193270 ||  || — || September 20, 2000 || Haleakala || NEAT || — || align=right | 1.3 km || 
|-id=271 bgcolor=#E9E9E9
| 193271 ||  || — || September 20, 2000 || Kitt Peak || Spacewatch || — || align=right | 1.9 km || 
|-id=272 bgcolor=#E9E9E9
| 193272 ||  || — || September 21, 2000 || Haleakala || NEAT || — || align=right | 1.4 km || 
|-id=273 bgcolor=#fefefe
| 193273 ||  || — || September 23, 2000 || Kitt Peak || Spacewatch || V || align=right | 1.3 km || 
|-id=274 bgcolor=#fefefe
| 193274 ||  || — || September 24, 2000 || Socorro || LINEAR || MAS || align=right | 1.2 km || 
|-id=275 bgcolor=#fefefe
| 193275 ||  || — || September 24, 2000 || Socorro || LINEAR || NYS || align=right data-sort-value="0.92" | 920 m || 
|-id=276 bgcolor=#fefefe
| 193276 ||  || — || September 24, 2000 || Socorro || LINEAR || — || align=right | 1.6 km || 
|-id=277 bgcolor=#fefefe
| 193277 ||  || — || September 25, 2000 || Socorro || LINEAR || — || align=right | 2.3 km || 
|-id=278 bgcolor=#E9E9E9
| 193278 ||  || — || September 25, 2000 || Socorro || LINEAR || — || align=right | 2.8 km || 
|-id=279 bgcolor=#fefefe
| 193279 ||  || — || September 25, 2000 || Socorro || LINEAR || V || align=right | 1.3 km || 
|-id=280 bgcolor=#E9E9E9
| 193280 ||  || — || September 25, 2000 || Socorro || LINEAR || — || align=right | 1.6 km || 
|-id=281 bgcolor=#E9E9E9
| 193281 ||  || — || September 26, 2000 || Socorro || LINEAR || KRM || align=right | 2.8 km || 
|-id=282 bgcolor=#d6d6d6
| 193282 ||  || — || September 26, 2000 || Socorro || LINEAR || — || align=right | 4.2 km || 
|-id=283 bgcolor=#fefefe
| 193283 ||  || — || September 26, 2000 || Socorro || LINEAR || — || align=right | 1.9 km || 
|-id=284 bgcolor=#fefefe
| 193284 ||  || — || September 27, 2000 || Socorro || LINEAR || — || align=right | 1.8 km || 
|-id=285 bgcolor=#fefefe
| 193285 ||  || — || September 27, 2000 || Socorro || LINEAR || — || align=right | 2.2 km || 
|-id=286 bgcolor=#E9E9E9
| 193286 ||  || — || September 24, 2000 || Socorro || LINEAR || — || align=right | 2.4 km || 
|-id=287 bgcolor=#FA8072
| 193287 ||  || — || September 24, 2000 || Socorro || LINEAR || H || align=right | 1.3 km || 
|-id=288 bgcolor=#FA8072
| 193288 ||  || — || September 26, 2000 || Socorro || LINEAR || H || align=right | 1.1 km || 
|-id=289 bgcolor=#E9E9E9
| 193289 ||  || — || September 27, 2000 || Socorro || LINEAR || — || align=right | 4.8 km || 
|-id=290 bgcolor=#fefefe
| 193290 ||  || — || September 28, 2000 || Socorro || LINEAR || H || align=right data-sort-value="0.80" | 800 m || 
|-id=291 bgcolor=#d6d6d6
| 193291 ||  || — || September 24, 2000 || Socorro || LINEAR || HIL || align=right | 7.7 km || 
|-id=292 bgcolor=#fefefe
| 193292 ||  || — || September 26, 2000 || Socorro || LINEAR || — || align=right | 2.0 km || 
|-id=293 bgcolor=#d6d6d6
| 193293 ||  || — || September 27, 2000 || Socorro || LINEAR || SHU3:2 || align=right | 8.7 km || 
|-id=294 bgcolor=#fefefe
| 193294 ||  || — || September 26, 2000 || Socorro || LINEAR || H || align=right | 1.3 km || 
|-id=295 bgcolor=#E9E9E9
| 193295 ||  || — || September 24, 2000 || Socorro || LINEAR || — || align=right | 1.2 km || 
|-id=296 bgcolor=#E9E9E9
| 193296 ||  || — || September 24, 2000 || Socorro || LINEAR || — || align=right | 1.1 km || 
|-id=297 bgcolor=#fefefe
| 193297 ||  || — || September 24, 2000 || Socorro || LINEAR || MAS || align=right | 1.1 km || 
|-id=298 bgcolor=#fefefe
| 193298 ||  || — || September 26, 2000 || Socorro || LINEAR || V || align=right | 1.1 km || 
|-id=299 bgcolor=#E9E9E9
| 193299 ||  || — || September 28, 2000 || Socorro || LINEAR || — || align=right | 1.8 km || 
|-id=300 bgcolor=#E9E9E9
| 193300 ||  || — || September 28, 2000 || Socorro || LINEAR || — || align=right | 2.9 km || 
|}

193301–193400 

|-bgcolor=#E9E9E9
| 193301 ||  || — || September 30, 2000 || Socorro || LINEAR || — || align=right | 2.1 km || 
|-id=302 bgcolor=#E9E9E9
| 193302 ||  || — || September 30, 2000 || Socorro || LINEAR || — || align=right | 1.5 km || 
|-id=303 bgcolor=#fefefe
| 193303 ||  || — || September 30, 2000 || Socorro || LINEAR || V || align=right | 1.4 km || 
|-id=304 bgcolor=#E9E9E9
| 193304 ||  || — || September 25, 2000 || Socorro || LINEAR || — || align=right | 1.8 km || 
|-id=305 bgcolor=#fefefe
| 193305 ||  || — || September 23, 2000 || Socorro || LINEAR || — || align=right | 1.6 km || 
|-id=306 bgcolor=#d6d6d6
| 193306 ||  || — || September 23, 2000 || Socorro || LINEAR || 3:2 || align=right | 11 km || 
|-id=307 bgcolor=#E9E9E9
| 193307 ||  || — || September 27, 2000 || Socorro || LINEAR || — || align=right | 2.4 km || 
|-id=308 bgcolor=#E9E9E9
| 193308 ||  || — || September 28, 2000 || Socorro || LINEAR || — || align=right | 1.6 km || 
|-id=309 bgcolor=#E9E9E9
| 193309 ||  || — || September 28, 2000 || Socorro || LINEAR || — || align=right | 2.4 km || 
|-id=310 bgcolor=#fefefe
| 193310 ||  || — || September 28, 2000 || Socorro || LINEAR || — || align=right | 1.6 km || 
|-id=311 bgcolor=#d6d6d6
| 193311 ||  || — || September 30, 2000 || Socorro || LINEAR || HIL3:2 || align=right | 8.1 km || 
|-id=312 bgcolor=#E9E9E9
| 193312 ||  || — || September 30, 2000 || Socorro || LINEAR || — || align=right | 3.6 km || 
|-id=313 bgcolor=#E9E9E9
| 193313 ||  || — || September 30, 2000 || Socorro || LINEAR || slow || align=right | 2.8 km || 
|-id=314 bgcolor=#E9E9E9
| 193314 ||  || — || September 30, 2000 || Socorro || LINEAR || — || align=right | 2.0 km || 
|-id=315 bgcolor=#E9E9E9
| 193315 ||  || — || September 30, 2000 || Socorro || LINEAR || — || align=right | 2.0 km || 
|-id=316 bgcolor=#fefefe
| 193316 ||  || — || September 30, 2000 || Socorro || LINEAR || LCI || align=right | 1.7 km || 
|-id=317 bgcolor=#E9E9E9
| 193317 ||  || — || September 28, 2000 || Socorro || LINEAR || — || align=right | 1.7 km || 
|-id=318 bgcolor=#d6d6d6
| 193318 ||  || — || September 28, 2000 || Socorro || LINEAR || 7:4 || align=right | 7.2 km || 
|-id=319 bgcolor=#E9E9E9
| 193319 ||  || — || September 28, 2000 || Kitt Peak || Spacewatch || — || align=right | 1.6 km || 
|-id=320 bgcolor=#E9E9E9
| 193320 ||  || — || September 30, 2000 || Socorro || LINEAR || — || align=right | 1.8 km || 
|-id=321 bgcolor=#fefefe
| 193321 ||  || — || September 26, 2000 || Kitt Peak || Spacewatch || — || align=right | 1.7 km || 
|-id=322 bgcolor=#fefefe
| 193322 ||  || — || September 23, 2000 || Anderson Mesa || LONEOS || — || align=right | 1.3 km || 
|-id=323 bgcolor=#d6d6d6
| 193323 ||  || — || September 23, 2000 || Socorro || LINEAR || HIL3:2 || align=right | 8.3 km || 
|-id=324 bgcolor=#E9E9E9
| 193324 ||  || — || September 25, 2000 || Anderson Mesa || LONEOS || — || align=right | 2.3 km || 
|-id=325 bgcolor=#fefefe
| 193325 ||  || — || October 1, 2000 || Socorro || LINEAR || NYS || align=right data-sort-value="0.85" | 850 m || 
|-id=326 bgcolor=#fefefe
| 193326 ||  || — || October 1, 2000 || Socorro || LINEAR || — || align=right | 1.3 km || 
|-id=327 bgcolor=#E9E9E9
| 193327 ||  || — || October 1, 2000 || Socorro || LINEAR || — || align=right | 1.4 km || 
|-id=328 bgcolor=#E9E9E9
| 193328 ||  || — || October 1, 2000 || Socorro || LINEAR || — || align=right | 2.4 km || 
|-id=329 bgcolor=#E9E9E9
| 193329 ||  || — || October 2, 2000 || Socorro || LINEAR || — || align=right | 2.0 km || 
|-id=330 bgcolor=#E9E9E9
| 193330 ||  || — || October 2, 2000 || Socorro || LINEAR || — || align=right | 1.2 km || 
|-id=331 bgcolor=#FA8072
| 193331 ||  || — || October 3, 2000 || Socorro || LINEAR || — || align=right | 1.7 km || 
|-id=332 bgcolor=#d6d6d6
| 193332 ||  || — || October 6, 2000 || Anderson Mesa || LONEOS || 3:2 || align=right | 6.3 km || 
|-id=333 bgcolor=#E9E9E9
| 193333 ||  || — || October 6, 2000 || Anderson Mesa || LONEOS || — || align=right | 1.4 km || 
|-id=334 bgcolor=#fefefe
| 193334 ||  || — || October 1, 2000 || Anderson Mesa || LONEOS || — || align=right | 1.1 km || 
|-id=335 bgcolor=#E9E9E9
| 193335 ||  || — || October 1, 2000 || Socorro || LINEAR || — || align=right | 1.5 km || 
|-id=336 bgcolor=#fefefe
| 193336 ||  || — || October 2, 2000 || Socorro || LINEAR || — || align=right | 1.1 km || 
|-id=337 bgcolor=#fefefe
| 193337 ||  || — || October 3, 2000 || Socorro || LINEAR || — || align=right | 1.3 km || 
|-id=338 bgcolor=#E9E9E9
| 193338 ||  || — || October 24, 2000 || Socorro || LINEAR || — || align=right | 2.1 km || 
|-id=339 bgcolor=#E9E9E9
| 193339 ||  || — || October 24, 2000 || Socorro || LINEAR || — || align=right | 2.3 km || 
|-id=340 bgcolor=#E9E9E9
| 193340 ||  || — || October 19, 2000 || Kitt Peak || Spacewatch || — || align=right | 2.1 km || 
|-id=341 bgcolor=#E9E9E9
| 193341 ||  || — || October 24, 2000 || Socorro || LINEAR || — || align=right | 1.8 km || 
|-id=342 bgcolor=#fefefe
| 193342 ||  || — || October 24, 2000 || Socorro || LINEAR || — || align=right | 1.2 km || 
|-id=343 bgcolor=#fefefe
| 193343 ||  || — || October 18, 2000 || Socorro || LINEAR || — || align=right | 1.5 km || 
|-id=344 bgcolor=#E9E9E9
| 193344 ||  || — || October 25, 2000 || Socorro || LINEAR || — || align=right | 2.7 km || 
|-id=345 bgcolor=#E9E9E9
| 193345 ||  || — || October 24, 2000 || Socorro || LINEAR || — || align=right | 1.3 km || 
|-id=346 bgcolor=#E9E9E9
| 193346 ||  || — || October 24, 2000 || Socorro || LINEAR || — || align=right | 1.5 km || 
|-id=347 bgcolor=#E9E9E9
| 193347 ||  || — || October 24, 2000 || Socorro || LINEAR || — || align=right | 4.3 km || 
|-id=348 bgcolor=#fefefe
| 193348 ||  || — || October 24, 2000 || Socorro || LINEAR || — || align=right | 1.7 km || 
|-id=349 bgcolor=#fefefe
| 193349 ||  || — || October 24, 2000 || Socorro || LINEAR || ERI || align=right | 4.7 km || 
|-id=350 bgcolor=#d6d6d6
| 193350 ||  || — || October 24, 2000 || Socorro || LINEAR || 3:2 || align=right | 8.1 km || 
|-id=351 bgcolor=#fefefe
| 193351 ||  || — || October 31, 2000 || Socorro || LINEAR || — || align=right | 1.7 km || 
|-id=352 bgcolor=#FA8072
| 193352 ||  || — || October 31, 2000 || Socorro || LINEAR || H || align=right | 1.2 km || 
|-id=353 bgcolor=#E9E9E9
| 193353 ||  || — || October 29, 2000 || Kitt Peak || Spacewatch || — || align=right | 2.3 km || 
|-id=354 bgcolor=#d6d6d6
| 193354 ||  || — || October 24, 2000 || Socorro || LINEAR || 3:2 || align=right | 7.7 km || 
|-id=355 bgcolor=#E9E9E9
| 193355 ||  || — || October 24, 2000 || Socorro || LINEAR || — || align=right | 1.9 km || 
|-id=356 bgcolor=#fefefe
| 193356 ||  || — || October 24, 2000 || Socorro || LINEAR || MAS || align=right | 1.3 km || 
|-id=357 bgcolor=#fefefe
| 193357 ||  || — || October 24, 2000 || Socorro || LINEAR || MAS || align=right | 1.5 km || 
|-id=358 bgcolor=#E9E9E9
| 193358 ||  || — || October 24, 2000 || Socorro || LINEAR || — || align=right | 1.8 km || 
|-id=359 bgcolor=#E9E9E9
| 193359 ||  || — || October 24, 2000 || Socorro || LINEAR || — || align=right | 1.9 km || 
|-id=360 bgcolor=#E9E9E9
| 193360 ||  || — || October 24, 2000 || Socorro || LINEAR || — || align=right | 1.5 km || 
|-id=361 bgcolor=#fefefe
| 193361 ||  || — || October 24, 2000 || Socorro || LINEAR || NYS || align=right | 1.5 km || 
|-id=362 bgcolor=#fefefe
| 193362 ||  || — || October 25, 2000 || Socorro || LINEAR || — || align=right | 3.5 km || 
|-id=363 bgcolor=#E9E9E9
| 193363 ||  || — || October 25, 2000 || Socorro || LINEAR || — || align=right | 1.5 km || 
|-id=364 bgcolor=#E9E9E9
| 193364 ||  || — || October 25, 2000 || Socorro || LINEAR || — || align=right | 1.4 km || 
|-id=365 bgcolor=#E9E9E9
| 193365 ||  || — || October 25, 2000 || Socorro || LINEAR || — || align=right | 1.8 km || 
|-id=366 bgcolor=#E9E9E9
| 193366 ||  || — || October 25, 2000 || Socorro || LINEAR || — || align=right | 1.6 km || 
|-id=367 bgcolor=#fefefe
| 193367 ||  || — || October 25, 2000 || Socorro || LINEAR || — || align=right | 1.5 km || 
|-id=368 bgcolor=#E9E9E9
| 193368 ||  || — || October 25, 2000 || Socorro || LINEAR || — || align=right | 1.7 km || 
|-id=369 bgcolor=#E9E9E9
| 193369 ||  || — || October 25, 2000 || Socorro || LINEAR || — || align=right | 2.1 km || 
|-id=370 bgcolor=#E9E9E9
| 193370 ||  || — || October 30, 2000 || Socorro || LINEAR || — || align=right | 2.0 km || 
|-id=371 bgcolor=#E9E9E9
| 193371 ||  || — || October 31, 2000 || Socorro || LINEAR || — || align=right | 5.5 km || 
|-id=372 bgcolor=#fefefe
| 193372 ||  || — || October 25, 2000 || Socorro || LINEAR || — || align=right | 1.9 km || 
|-id=373 bgcolor=#fefefe
| 193373 ||  || — || October 29, 2000 || Socorro || LINEAR || — || align=right | 1.4 km || 
|-id=374 bgcolor=#fefefe
| 193374 ||  || — || October 30, 2000 || Socorro || LINEAR || — || align=right | 1.7 km || 
|-id=375 bgcolor=#fefefe
| 193375 ||  || — || October 30, 2000 || Socorro || LINEAR || — || align=right | 1.5 km || 
|-id=376 bgcolor=#E9E9E9
| 193376 ||  || — || October 31, 2000 || Socorro || LINEAR || — || align=right | 2.1 km || 
|-id=377 bgcolor=#E9E9E9
| 193377 ||  || — || November 1, 2000 || Kitt Peak || Spacewatch || — || align=right | 1.8 km || 
|-id=378 bgcolor=#E9E9E9
| 193378 ||  || — || November 1, 2000 || Socorro || LINEAR || — || align=right | 2.5 km || 
|-id=379 bgcolor=#E9E9E9
| 193379 ||  || — || November 1, 2000 || Socorro || LINEAR || — || align=right | 1.7 km || 
|-id=380 bgcolor=#E9E9E9
| 193380 ||  || — || November 1, 2000 || Socorro || LINEAR || — || align=right | 1.7 km || 
|-id=381 bgcolor=#E9E9E9
| 193381 ||  || — || November 1, 2000 || Socorro || LINEAR || — || align=right | 1.9 km || 
|-id=382 bgcolor=#E9E9E9
| 193382 ||  || — || November 1, 2000 || Socorro || LINEAR || — || align=right | 4.8 km || 
|-id=383 bgcolor=#E9E9E9
| 193383 ||  || — || November 1, 2000 || Socorro || LINEAR || — || align=right | 2.0 km || 
|-id=384 bgcolor=#E9E9E9
| 193384 ||  || — || November 1, 2000 || Socorro || LINEAR || — || align=right | 2.0 km || 
|-id=385 bgcolor=#E9E9E9
| 193385 ||  || — || November 1, 2000 || Socorro || LINEAR || — || align=right | 1.9 km || 
|-id=386 bgcolor=#fefefe
| 193386 ||  || — || November 1, 2000 || Socorro || LINEAR || — || align=right | 1.7 km || 
|-id=387 bgcolor=#E9E9E9
| 193387 ||  || — || November 1, 2000 || Socorro || LINEAR || JUN || align=right | 1.7 km || 
|-id=388 bgcolor=#fefefe
| 193388 ||  || — || November 1, 2000 || Socorro || LINEAR || — || align=right | 1.6 km || 
|-id=389 bgcolor=#fefefe
| 193389 ||  || — || November 2, 2000 || Socorro || LINEAR || H || align=right data-sort-value="0.96" | 960 m || 
|-id=390 bgcolor=#E9E9E9
| 193390 ||  || — || November 3, 2000 || Socorro || LINEAR || BRU || align=right | 7.4 km || 
|-id=391 bgcolor=#E9E9E9
| 193391 ||  || — || November 2, 2000 || Socorro || LINEAR || — || align=right | 4.3 km || 
|-id=392 bgcolor=#E9E9E9
| 193392 ||  || — || November 3, 2000 || Socorro || LINEAR || — || align=right | 2.0 km || 
|-id=393 bgcolor=#fefefe
| 193393 ||  || — || November 9, 2000 || Socorro || LINEAR || H || align=right | 1.0 km || 
|-id=394 bgcolor=#E9E9E9
| 193394 ||  || — || November 17, 2000 || Kitt Peak || Spacewatch || — || align=right | 2.4 km || 
|-id=395 bgcolor=#E9E9E9
| 193395 ||  || — || November 19, 2000 || Socorro || LINEAR || — || align=right | 1.3 km || 
|-id=396 bgcolor=#E9E9E9
| 193396 ||  || — || November 20, 2000 || Socorro || LINEAR || — || align=right | 3.9 km || 
|-id=397 bgcolor=#E9E9E9
| 193397 ||  || — || November 22, 2000 || Bohyunsan || Bohyunsan Obs. || — || align=right | 1.8 km || 
|-id=398 bgcolor=#d6d6d6
| 193398 ||  || — || November 20, 2000 || Socorro || LINEAR || 3:2 || align=right | 7.7 km || 
|-id=399 bgcolor=#E9E9E9
| 193399 ||  || — || November 20, 2000 || Socorro || LINEAR || — || align=right | 3.2 km || 
|-id=400 bgcolor=#E9E9E9
| 193400 ||  || — || November 21, 2000 || Socorro || LINEAR || — || align=right | 1.8 km || 
|}

193401–193500 

|-bgcolor=#E9E9E9
| 193401 ||  || — || November 23, 2000 || Kitt Peak || Spacewatch || — || align=right | 2.0 km || 
|-id=402 bgcolor=#E9E9E9
| 193402 ||  || — || November 21, 2000 || Socorro || LINEAR || — || align=right | 1.4 km || 
|-id=403 bgcolor=#fefefe
| 193403 ||  || — || November 21, 2000 || Socorro || LINEAR || H || align=right | 1.1 km || 
|-id=404 bgcolor=#FA8072
| 193404 ||  || — || November 25, 2000 || Socorro || LINEAR || H || align=right | 1.4 km || 
|-id=405 bgcolor=#E9E9E9
| 193405 ||  || — || November 20, 2000 || Socorro || LINEAR || — || align=right | 2.3 km || 
|-id=406 bgcolor=#E9E9E9
| 193406 ||  || — || November 20, 2000 || Socorro || LINEAR || KAZ || align=right | 1.9 km || 
|-id=407 bgcolor=#E9E9E9
| 193407 ||  || — || November 20, 2000 || Socorro || LINEAR || — || align=right | 2.9 km || 
|-id=408 bgcolor=#E9E9E9
| 193408 ||  || — || November 20, 2000 || Socorro || LINEAR || — || align=right | 1.5 km || 
|-id=409 bgcolor=#E9E9E9
| 193409 ||  || — || November 20, 2000 || Socorro || LINEAR || — || align=right | 1.9 km || 
|-id=410 bgcolor=#E9E9E9
| 193410 ||  || — || November 26, 2000 || Socorro || LINEAR || — || align=right | 3.5 km || 
|-id=411 bgcolor=#E9E9E9
| 193411 ||  || — || November 27, 2000 || Kitt Peak || Spacewatch || KON || align=right | 3.0 km || 
|-id=412 bgcolor=#E9E9E9
| 193412 ||  || — || November 21, 2000 || Socorro || LINEAR || MIT || align=right | 4.7 km || 
|-id=413 bgcolor=#E9E9E9
| 193413 ||  || — || November 21, 2000 || Socorro || LINEAR || MIT || align=right | 5.0 km || 
|-id=414 bgcolor=#E9E9E9
| 193414 ||  || — || November 28, 2000 || Kitt Peak || Spacewatch || — || align=right | 2.2 km || 
|-id=415 bgcolor=#fefefe
| 193415 ||  || — || November 26, 2000 || Socorro || LINEAR || H || align=right data-sort-value="0.75" | 750 m || 
|-id=416 bgcolor=#E9E9E9
| 193416 ||  || — || November 29, 2000 || Kitt Peak || Kitt Peak Obs. || — || align=right | 1.8 km || 
|-id=417 bgcolor=#E9E9E9
| 193417 ||  || — || November 19, 2000 || Socorro || LINEAR || — || align=right | 2.2 km || 
|-id=418 bgcolor=#E9E9E9
| 193418 ||  || — || November 19, 2000 || Socorro || LINEAR || — || align=right | 3.1 km || 
|-id=419 bgcolor=#fefefe
| 193419 ||  || — || November 20, 2000 || Socorro || LINEAR || — || align=right | 1.7 km || 
|-id=420 bgcolor=#E9E9E9
| 193420 ||  || — || November 20, 2000 || Socorro || LINEAR || — || align=right | 3.7 km || 
|-id=421 bgcolor=#E9E9E9
| 193421 ||  || — || November 20, 2000 || Socorro || LINEAR || — || align=right | 3.3 km || 
|-id=422 bgcolor=#E9E9E9
| 193422 ||  || — || November 20, 2000 || Socorro || LINEAR || — || align=right | 5.7 km || 
|-id=423 bgcolor=#E9E9E9
| 193423 ||  || — || November 21, 2000 || Socorro || LINEAR || — || align=right | 1.3 km || 
|-id=424 bgcolor=#fefefe
| 193424 ||  || — || November 21, 2000 || Socorro || LINEAR || NYS || align=right | 1.4 km || 
|-id=425 bgcolor=#E9E9E9
| 193425 ||  || — || November 21, 2000 || Socorro || LINEAR || — || align=right | 2.3 km || 
|-id=426 bgcolor=#E9E9E9
| 193426 ||  || — || November 21, 2000 || Socorro || LINEAR || — || align=right | 2.0 km || 
|-id=427 bgcolor=#E9E9E9
| 193427 ||  || — || November 21, 2000 || Socorro || LINEAR || — || align=right | 1.9 km || 
|-id=428 bgcolor=#E9E9E9
| 193428 ||  || — || November 21, 2000 || Socorro || LINEAR || — || align=right | 3.2 km || 
|-id=429 bgcolor=#fefefe
| 193429 ||  || — || November 26, 2000 || Socorro || LINEAR || — || align=right | 2.3 km || 
|-id=430 bgcolor=#E9E9E9
| 193430 ||  || — || November 20, 2000 || Socorro || LINEAR || — || align=right | 2.4 km || 
|-id=431 bgcolor=#E9E9E9
| 193431 ||  || — || November 20, 2000 || Socorro || LINEAR || RAF || align=right | 1.8 km || 
|-id=432 bgcolor=#E9E9E9
| 193432 ||  || — || November 20, 2000 || Socorro || LINEAR || — || align=right | 1.6 km || 
|-id=433 bgcolor=#E9E9E9
| 193433 ||  || — || November 20, 2000 || Socorro || LINEAR || — || align=right | 2.0 km || 
|-id=434 bgcolor=#E9E9E9
| 193434 ||  || — || November 20, 2000 || Socorro || LINEAR || — || align=right | 1.9 km || 
|-id=435 bgcolor=#fefefe
| 193435 ||  || — || November 20, 2000 || Socorro || LINEAR || — || align=right | 2.7 km || 
|-id=436 bgcolor=#E9E9E9
| 193436 ||  || — || November 20, 2000 || Socorro || LINEAR || — || align=right | 2.5 km || 
|-id=437 bgcolor=#E9E9E9
| 193437 ||  || — || November 20, 2000 || Socorro || LINEAR || — || align=right | 2.2 km || 
|-id=438 bgcolor=#E9E9E9
| 193438 ||  || — || November 29, 2000 || Socorro || LINEAR || — || align=right | 2.3 km || 
|-id=439 bgcolor=#fefefe
| 193439 ||  || — || November 29, 2000 || Socorro || LINEAR || H || align=right | 1.3 km || 
|-id=440 bgcolor=#E9E9E9
| 193440 ||  || — || November 16, 2000 || Kitt Peak || Spacewatch || — || align=right | 2.0 km || 
|-id=441 bgcolor=#E9E9E9
| 193441 ||  || — || November 17, 2000 || Kitt Peak || Spacewatch || — || align=right | 1.7 km || 
|-id=442 bgcolor=#E9E9E9
| 193442 ||  || — || November 19, 2000 || Kitt Peak || Spacewatch || — || align=right | 2.2 km || 
|-id=443 bgcolor=#E9E9E9
| 193443 ||  || — || November 20, 2000 || Anderson Mesa || LONEOS || — || align=right | 1.7 km || 
|-id=444 bgcolor=#E9E9E9
| 193444 ||  || — || November 19, 2000 || Socorro || LINEAR || — || align=right | 2.8 km || 
|-id=445 bgcolor=#fefefe
| 193445 ||  || — || November 20, 2000 || Socorro || LINEAR || — || align=right | 1.4 km || 
|-id=446 bgcolor=#E9E9E9
| 193446 ||  || — || November 21, 2000 || Socorro || LINEAR || — || align=right | 1.8 km || 
|-id=447 bgcolor=#E9E9E9
| 193447 ||  || — || November 21, 2000 || Socorro || LINEAR || — || align=right | 1.7 km || 
|-id=448 bgcolor=#E9E9E9
| 193448 ||  || — || November 20, 2000 || Anderson Mesa || LONEOS || — || align=right | 2.0 km || 
|-id=449 bgcolor=#d6d6d6
| 193449 ||  || — || November 28, 2000 || Haleakala || NEAT || Tj (2.9) || align=right | 9.1 km || 
|-id=450 bgcolor=#E9E9E9
| 193450 ||  || — || November 29, 2000 || Višnjan Observatory || K. Korlević || — || align=right | 1.7 km || 
|-id=451 bgcolor=#E9E9E9
| 193451 ||  || — || November 30, 2000 || Socorro || LINEAR || — || align=right | 5.0 km || 
|-id=452 bgcolor=#E9E9E9
| 193452 ||  || — || November 25, 2000 || Anderson Mesa || LONEOS || — || align=right | 3.0 km || 
|-id=453 bgcolor=#E9E9E9
| 193453 ||  || — || November 24, 2000 || Anderson Mesa || LONEOS || MAR || align=right | 2.5 km || 
|-id=454 bgcolor=#E9E9E9
| 193454 ||  || — || November 26, 2000 || Socorro || LINEAR || — || align=right | 1.9 km || 
|-id=455 bgcolor=#E9E9E9
| 193455 ||  || — || November 30, 2000 || Anderson Mesa || LONEOS || HNS || align=right | 1.9 km || 
|-id=456 bgcolor=#fefefe
| 193456 ||  || — || December 1, 2000 || Socorro || LINEAR || H || align=right data-sort-value="0.99" | 990 m || 
|-id=457 bgcolor=#E9E9E9
| 193457 ||  || — || December 1, 2000 || Bohyunsan || Bohyunsan Obs. || — || align=right | 1.1 km || 
|-id=458 bgcolor=#E9E9E9
| 193458 ||  || — || December 1, 2000 || Socorro || LINEAR || — || align=right | 1.4 km || 
|-id=459 bgcolor=#E9E9E9
| 193459 ||  || — || December 1, 2000 || Socorro || LINEAR || MAR || align=right | 2.0 km || 
|-id=460 bgcolor=#E9E9E9
| 193460 ||  || — || December 1, 2000 || Socorro || LINEAR || — || align=right | 1.1 km || 
|-id=461 bgcolor=#E9E9E9
| 193461 ||  || — || December 1, 2000 || Socorro || LINEAR || — || align=right | 1.4 km || 
|-id=462 bgcolor=#E9E9E9
| 193462 ||  || — || December 1, 2000 || Socorro || LINEAR || — || align=right | 2.1 km || 
|-id=463 bgcolor=#E9E9E9
| 193463 ||  || — || December 1, 2000 || Socorro || LINEAR || — || align=right | 3.9 km || 
|-id=464 bgcolor=#E9E9E9
| 193464 ||  || — || December 4, 2000 || Socorro || LINEAR || — || align=right | 4.1 km || 
|-id=465 bgcolor=#E9E9E9
| 193465 ||  || — || December 4, 2000 || Socorro || LINEAR || — || align=right | 4.1 km || 
|-id=466 bgcolor=#E9E9E9
| 193466 ||  || — || December 1, 2000 || Socorro || LINEAR || — || align=right | 2.6 km || 
|-id=467 bgcolor=#E9E9E9
| 193467 ||  || — || December 1, 2000 || Socorro || LINEAR || — || align=right | 2.4 km || 
|-id=468 bgcolor=#E9E9E9
| 193468 ||  || — || December 1, 2000 || Socorro || LINEAR || — || align=right | 1.8 km || 
|-id=469 bgcolor=#E9E9E9
| 193469 ||  || — || December 4, 2000 || Socorro || LINEAR || — || align=right | 2.9 km || 
|-id=470 bgcolor=#E9E9E9
| 193470 ||  || — || December 4, 2000 || Socorro || LINEAR || EUN || align=right | 2.5 km || 
|-id=471 bgcolor=#E9E9E9
| 193471 ||  || — || December 4, 2000 || Socorro || LINEAR || — || align=right | 2.8 km || 
|-id=472 bgcolor=#E9E9E9
| 193472 ||  || — || December 4, 2000 || Socorro || LINEAR || — || align=right | 2.7 km || 
|-id=473 bgcolor=#E9E9E9
| 193473 ||  || — || December 4, 2000 || Socorro || LINEAR || EUN || align=right | 2.5 km || 
|-id=474 bgcolor=#E9E9E9
| 193474 ||  || — || December 4, 2000 || Socorro || LINEAR || — || align=right | 2.7 km || 
|-id=475 bgcolor=#E9E9E9
| 193475 ||  || — || December 4, 2000 || Socorro || LINEAR || — || align=right | 5.2 km || 
|-id=476 bgcolor=#E9E9E9
| 193476 ||  || — || December 4, 2000 || Socorro || LINEAR || GER || align=right | 3.5 km || 
|-id=477 bgcolor=#E9E9E9
| 193477 ||  || — || December 5, 2000 || Socorro || LINEAR || — || align=right | 2.2 km || 
|-id=478 bgcolor=#E9E9E9
| 193478 ||  || — || December 5, 2000 || Socorro || LINEAR || — || align=right | 4.0 km || 
|-id=479 bgcolor=#E9E9E9
| 193479 ||  || — || December 5, 2000 || Socorro || LINEAR || — || align=right | 2.8 km || 
|-id=480 bgcolor=#E9E9E9
| 193480 ||  || — || December 5, 2000 || Socorro || LINEAR || — || align=right | 2.3 km || 
|-id=481 bgcolor=#E9E9E9
| 193481 ||  || — || December 5, 2000 || Socorro || LINEAR || — || align=right | 2.5 km || 
|-id=482 bgcolor=#E9E9E9
| 193482 ||  || — || December 5, 2000 || Socorro || LINEAR || — || align=right | 4.3 km || 
|-id=483 bgcolor=#E9E9E9
| 193483 ||  || — || December 7, 2000 || Socorro || LINEAR || — || align=right | 2.4 km || 
|-id=484 bgcolor=#E9E9E9
| 193484 ||  || — || December 6, 2000 || Socorro || LINEAR || BRG || align=right | 3.9 km || 
|-id=485 bgcolor=#E9E9E9
| 193485 ||  || — || December 6, 2000 || Socorro || LINEAR || ADE || align=right | 3.2 km || 
|-id=486 bgcolor=#E9E9E9
| 193486 ||  || — || December 6, 2000 || Socorro || LINEAR || MAR || align=right | 2.2 km || 
|-id=487 bgcolor=#E9E9E9
| 193487 ||  || — || December 14, 2000 || Bohyunsan || Y.-B. Jeon, B.-C. Lee || — || align=right | 1.9 km || 
|-id=488 bgcolor=#E9E9E9
| 193488 || 2000 YQ || — || December 16, 2000 || Socorro || LINEAR || — || align=right | 3.1 km || 
|-id=489 bgcolor=#E9E9E9
| 193489 ||  || — || December 17, 2000 || Socorro || LINEAR || — || align=right | 3.3 km || 
|-id=490 bgcolor=#E9E9E9
| 193490 ||  || — || December 19, 2000 || Socorro || LINEAR || MAR || align=right | 2.2 km || 
|-id=491 bgcolor=#E9E9E9
| 193491 ||  || — || December 20, 2000 || Socorro || LINEAR || — || align=right | 1.9 km || 
|-id=492 bgcolor=#E9E9E9
| 193492 ||  || — || December 20, 2000 || Socorro || LINEAR || — || align=right | 1.8 km || 
|-id=493 bgcolor=#E9E9E9
| 193493 ||  || — || December 21, 2000 || Heppenheim || Starkenburg Obs. || — || align=right | 1.2 km || 
|-id=494 bgcolor=#E9E9E9
| 193494 ||  || — || December 20, 2000 || Socorro || LINEAR || — || align=right | 2.1 km || 
|-id=495 bgcolor=#E9E9E9
| 193495 ||  || — || December 21, 2000 || Socorro || LINEAR || — || align=right | 4.7 km || 
|-id=496 bgcolor=#E9E9E9
| 193496 ||  || — || December 22, 2000 || Anderson Mesa || LONEOS || — || align=right | 1.9 km || 
|-id=497 bgcolor=#fefefe
| 193497 ||  || — || December 20, 2000 || Socorro || LINEAR || H || align=right | 1.3 km || 
|-id=498 bgcolor=#E9E9E9
| 193498 ||  || — || December 25, 2000 || Ondřejov || P. Kušnirák || — || align=right | 4.1 km || 
|-id=499 bgcolor=#E9E9E9
| 193499 ||  || — || December 27, 2000 || Kitt Peak || Spacewatch || EUN || align=right | 2.6 km || 
|-id=500 bgcolor=#E9E9E9
| 193500 ||  || — || December 28, 2000 || Kitt Peak || Spacewatch || — || align=right | 2.3 km || 
|}

193501–193600 

|-bgcolor=#d6d6d6
| 193501 ||  || — || December 28, 2000 || Kitt Peak || Spacewatch || HIL3:2 || align=right | 7.5 km || 
|-id=502 bgcolor=#E9E9E9
| 193502 ||  || — || December 28, 2000 || Kitt Peak || Spacewatch || — || align=right | 1.9 km || 
|-id=503 bgcolor=#E9E9E9
| 193503 ||  || — || December 26, 2000 || Haleakala || NEAT || HNS || align=right | 1.9 km || 
|-id=504 bgcolor=#E9E9E9
| 193504 ||  || — || December 30, 2000 || Socorro || LINEAR || — || align=right | 1.8 km || 
|-id=505 bgcolor=#E9E9E9
| 193505 ||  || — || December 30, 2000 || Socorro || LINEAR || — || align=right | 4.5 km || 
|-id=506 bgcolor=#E9E9E9
| 193506 ||  || — || December 30, 2000 || Socorro || LINEAR || — || align=right | 3.7 km || 
|-id=507 bgcolor=#E9E9E9
| 193507 ||  || — || December 30, 2000 || Socorro || LINEAR || — || align=right | 2.7 km || 
|-id=508 bgcolor=#E9E9E9
| 193508 ||  || — || December 30, 2000 || Socorro || LINEAR || — || align=right | 1.6 km || 
|-id=509 bgcolor=#E9E9E9
| 193509 ||  || — || December 30, 2000 || Socorro || LINEAR || — || align=right | 2.8 km || 
|-id=510 bgcolor=#E9E9E9
| 193510 ||  || — || December 30, 2000 || Socorro || LINEAR || — || align=right | 1.6 km || 
|-id=511 bgcolor=#E9E9E9
| 193511 ||  || — || December 30, 2000 || Socorro || LINEAR || — || align=right | 2.5 km || 
|-id=512 bgcolor=#E9E9E9
| 193512 ||  || — || December 30, 2000 || Socorro || LINEAR || — || align=right | 4.8 km || 
|-id=513 bgcolor=#E9E9E9
| 193513 ||  || — || December 30, 2000 || Socorro || LINEAR || KON || align=right | 4.4 km || 
|-id=514 bgcolor=#E9E9E9
| 193514 ||  || — || December 30, 2000 || Socorro || LINEAR || — || align=right | 2.6 km || 
|-id=515 bgcolor=#E9E9E9
| 193515 ||  || — || December 30, 2000 || Socorro || LINEAR || — || align=right | 2.4 km || 
|-id=516 bgcolor=#E9E9E9
| 193516 ||  || — || December 30, 2000 || Socorro || LINEAR || — || align=right | 3.2 km || 
|-id=517 bgcolor=#E9E9E9
| 193517 ||  || — || December 30, 2000 || Socorro || LINEAR || — || align=right | 1.6 km || 
|-id=518 bgcolor=#fefefe
| 193518 ||  || — || December 30, 2000 || Socorro || LINEAR || KLI || align=right | 2.9 km || 
|-id=519 bgcolor=#E9E9E9
| 193519 ||  || — || December 30, 2000 || Socorro || LINEAR || — || align=right | 5.2 km || 
|-id=520 bgcolor=#E9E9E9
| 193520 ||  || — || December 30, 2000 || Socorro || LINEAR || — || align=right | 4.1 km || 
|-id=521 bgcolor=#E9E9E9
| 193521 ||  || — || December 30, 2000 || Socorro || LINEAR || — || align=right | 2.5 km || 
|-id=522 bgcolor=#fefefe
| 193522 ||  || — || December 30, 2000 || Haleakala || NEAT || H || align=right data-sort-value="0.96" | 960 m || 
|-id=523 bgcolor=#E9E9E9
| 193523 ||  || — || December 30, 2000 || Socorro || LINEAR || — || align=right | 2.3 km || 
|-id=524 bgcolor=#E9E9E9
| 193524 ||  || — || December 30, 2000 || Socorro || LINEAR || — || align=right | 1.4 km || 
|-id=525 bgcolor=#E9E9E9
| 193525 ||  || — || December 30, 2000 || Socorro || LINEAR || — || align=right | 2.3 km || 
|-id=526 bgcolor=#E9E9E9
| 193526 ||  || — || December 30, 2000 || Socorro || LINEAR || MAR || align=right | 3.2 km || 
|-id=527 bgcolor=#E9E9E9
| 193527 ||  || — || December 30, 2000 || Socorro || LINEAR || — || align=right | 2.8 km || 
|-id=528 bgcolor=#E9E9E9
| 193528 ||  || — || December 30, 2000 || Socorro || LINEAR || — || align=right | 1.5 km || 
|-id=529 bgcolor=#E9E9E9
| 193529 ||  || — || December 30, 2000 || Socorro || LINEAR || — || align=right | 2.2 km || 
|-id=530 bgcolor=#E9E9E9
| 193530 ||  || — || December 30, 2000 || Socorro || LINEAR || — || align=right | 4.7 km || 
|-id=531 bgcolor=#E9E9E9
| 193531 ||  || — || December 30, 2000 || Socorro || LINEAR || — || align=right | 2.3 km || 
|-id=532 bgcolor=#E9E9E9
| 193532 ||  || — || December 30, 2000 || Socorro || LINEAR || MIS || align=right | 3.2 km || 
|-id=533 bgcolor=#E9E9E9
| 193533 ||  || — || December 30, 2000 || Socorro || LINEAR || — || align=right | 3.2 km || 
|-id=534 bgcolor=#E9E9E9
| 193534 ||  || — || December 30, 2000 || Socorro || LINEAR || — || align=right | 4.0 km || 
|-id=535 bgcolor=#C2FFFF
| 193535 ||  || — || December 30, 2000 || Socorro || LINEAR || L4 || align=right | 15 km || 
|-id=536 bgcolor=#E9E9E9
| 193536 ||  || — || December 30, 2000 || Socorro || LINEAR || RAF || align=right | 1.7 km || 
|-id=537 bgcolor=#E9E9E9
| 193537 ||  || — || December 30, 2000 || Socorro || LINEAR || — || align=right | 2.2 km || 
|-id=538 bgcolor=#E9E9E9
| 193538 ||  || — || December 30, 2000 || Socorro || LINEAR || MIS || align=right | 2.7 km || 
|-id=539 bgcolor=#E9E9E9
| 193539 ||  || — || December 30, 2000 || Socorro || LINEAR || — || align=right | 3.3 km || 
|-id=540 bgcolor=#E9E9E9
| 193540 ||  || — || December 30, 2000 || Socorro || LINEAR || — || align=right | 2.4 km || 
|-id=541 bgcolor=#E9E9E9
| 193541 ||  || — || December 30, 2000 || Socorro || LINEAR || — || align=right | 4.8 km || 
|-id=542 bgcolor=#E9E9E9
| 193542 ||  || — || December 30, 2000 || Socorro || LINEAR || — || align=right | 1.8 km || 
|-id=543 bgcolor=#E9E9E9
| 193543 ||  || — || December 30, 2000 || Socorro || LINEAR || — || align=right | 2.0 km || 
|-id=544 bgcolor=#E9E9E9
| 193544 ||  || — || December 30, 2000 || Socorro || LINEAR || — || align=right | 2.4 km || 
|-id=545 bgcolor=#E9E9E9
| 193545 ||  || — || December 30, 2000 || Socorro || LINEAR || — || align=right | 3.9 km || 
|-id=546 bgcolor=#E9E9E9
| 193546 ||  || — || December 19, 2000 || Socorro || LINEAR || JUN || align=right | 2.0 km || 
|-id=547 bgcolor=#E9E9E9
| 193547 ||  || — || December 20, 2000 || Socorro || LINEAR || — || align=right | 1.9 km || 
|-id=548 bgcolor=#E9E9E9
| 193548 ||  || — || December 21, 2000 || Socorro || LINEAR || — || align=right | 2.3 km || 
|-id=549 bgcolor=#E9E9E9
| 193549 ||  || — || December 28, 2000 || Kitt Peak || Spacewatch || — || align=right | 1.9 km || 
|-id=550 bgcolor=#E9E9E9
| 193550 ||  || — || December 29, 2000 || Anderson Mesa || LONEOS || — || align=right | 2.7 km || 
|-id=551 bgcolor=#E9E9E9
| 193551 ||  || — || December 29, 2000 || Anderson Mesa || LONEOS || — || align=right | 2.7 km || 
|-id=552 bgcolor=#E9E9E9
| 193552 ||  || — || December 29, 2000 || Anderson Mesa || LONEOS || — || align=right | 1.9 km || 
|-id=553 bgcolor=#E9E9E9
| 193553 ||  || — || December 30, 2000 || Socorro || LINEAR || — || align=right | 2.6 km || 
|-id=554 bgcolor=#E9E9E9
| 193554 ||  || — || December 31, 2000 || Anderson Mesa || LONEOS || — || align=right | 1.5 km || 
|-id=555 bgcolor=#E9E9E9
| 193555 ||  || — || December 23, 2000 || Socorro || LINEAR || — || align=right | 2.1 km || 
|-id=556 bgcolor=#E9E9E9
| 193556 ||  || — || December 31, 2000 || Anderson Mesa || LONEOS || — || align=right | 2.3 km || 
|-id=557 bgcolor=#E9E9E9
| 193557 ||  || — || January 2, 2001 || Socorro || LINEAR || — || align=right | 2.1 km || 
|-id=558 bgcolor=#E9E9E9
| 193558 ||  || — || January 2, 2001 || Socorro || LINEAR || EUN || align=right | 2.4 km || 
|-id=559 bgcolor=#E9E9E9
| 193559 ||  || — || January 2, 2001 || Socorro || LINEAR || — || align=right | 2.2 km || 
|-id=560 bgcolor=#E9E9E9
| 193560 ||  || — || January 2, 2001 || Socorro || LINEAR || WIT || align=right | 1.8 km || 
|-id=561 bgcolor=#E9E9E9
| 193561 ||  || — || January 2, 2001 || Socorro || LINEAR || — || align=right | 2.2 km || 
|-id=562 bgcolor=#E9E9E9
| 193562 ||  || — || January 2, 2001 || Socorro || LINEAR || MIT || align=right | 7.4 km || 
|-id=563 bgcolor=#E9E9E9
| 193563 ||  || — || January 2, 2001 || Socorro || LINEAR || ADE || align=right | 5.4 km || 
|-id=564 bgcolor=#E9E9E9
| 193564 ||  || — || January 2, 2001 || Socorro || LINEAR || — || align=right | 2.3 km || 
|-id=565 bgcolor=#E9E9E9
| 193565 ||  || — || January 5, 2001 || Socorro || LINEAR || — || align=right | 2.3 km || 
|-id=566 bgcolor=#E9E9E9
| 193566 ||  || — || January 4, 2001 || Socorro || LINEAR || — || align=right | 2.2 km || 
|-id=567 bgcolor=#E9E9E9
| 193567 ||  || — || January 4, 2001 || Socorro || LINEAR || — || align=right | 2.2 km || 
|-id=568 bgcolor=#E9E9E9
| 193568 ||  || — || January 4, 2001 || Socorro || LINEAR || — || align=right | 2.9 km || 
|-id=569 bgcolor=#E9E9E9
| 193569 ||  || — || January 4, 2001 || Socorro || LINEAR || — || align=right | 2.5 km || 
|-id=570 bgcolor=#C2FFFF
| 193570 ||  || — || January 5, 2001 || Socorro || LINEAR || L4 || align=right | 19 km || 
|-id=571 bgcolor=#E9E9E9
| 193571 ||  || — || January 3, 2001 || Anderson Mesa || LONEOS || — || align=right | 1.5 km || 
|-id=572 bgcolor=#E9E9E9
| 193572 ||  || — || January 3, 2001 || Anderson Mesa || LONEOS || — || align=right | 1.9 km || 
|-id=573 bgcolor=#E9E9E9
| 193573 ||  || — || January 4, 2001 || Anderson Mesa || LONEOS || — || align=right | 1.4 km || 
|-id=574 bgcolor=#E9E9E9
| 193574 || 2001 BB || — || January 17, 2001 || Oizumi || T. Kobayashi || MRX || align=right | 2.5 km || 
|-id=575 bgcolor=#E9E9E9
| 193575 || 2001 BF || — || January 17, 2001 || Oizumi || T. Kobayashi || GEF || align=right | 2.5 km || 
|-id=576 bgcolor=#E9E9E9
| 193576 || 2001 BG || — || January 17, 2001 || Oizumi || T. Kobayashi || — || align=right | 1.9 km || 
|-id=577 bgcolor=#E9E9E9
| 193577 ||  || — || January 16, 2001 || Kitt Peak || Spacewatch || — || align=right | 2.0 km || 
|-id=578 bgcolor=#E9E9E9
| 193578 ||  || — || January 16, 2001 || Haleakala || NEAT || — || align=right | 3.3 km || 
|-id=579 bgcolor=#fefefe
| 193579 ||  || — || January 18, 2001 || Socorro || LINEAR || H || align=right | 1.3 km || 
|-id=580 bgcolor=#E9E9E9
| 193580 ||  || — || January 19, 2001 || Socorro || LINEAR || — || align=right | 3.1 km || 
|-id=581 bgcolor=#E9E9E9
| 193581 ||  || — || January 16, 2001 || Kitt Peak || Spacewatch || — || align=right | 2.2 km || 
|-id=582 bgcolor=#E9E9E9
| 193582 ||  || — || January 16, 2001 || Haleakala || NEAT || JUN || align=right | 1.8 km || 
|-id=583 bgcolor=#E9E9E9
| 193583 ||  || — || January 19, 2001 || Socorro || LINEAR || — || align=right | 2.6 km || 
|-id=584 bgcolor=#E9E9E9
| 193584 ||  || — || January 20, 2001 || Socorro || LINEAR || MIT || align=right | 6.1 km || 
|-id=585 bgcolor=#E9E9E9
| 193585 ||  || — || January 20, 2001 || Socorro || LINEAR || — || align=right | 4.7 km || 
|-id=586 bgcolor=#E9E9E9
| 193586 ||  || — || January 21, 2001 || Socorro || LINEAR || — || align=right | 1.8 km || 
|-id=587 bgcolor=#E9E9E9
| 193587 ||  || — || January 23, 2001 || Oizumi || T. Kobayashi || — || align=right | 3.9 km || 
|-id=588 bgcolor=#E9E9E9
| 193588 ||  || — || January 18, 2001 || Socorro || LINEAR || — || align=right | 6.0 km || 
|-id=589 bgcolor=#E9E9E9
| 193589 ||  || — || January 19, 2001 || Socorro || LINEAR || JUN || align=right | 1.9 km || 
|-id=590 bgcolor=#E9E9E9
| 193590 ||  || — || January 21, 2001 || Socorro || LINEAR || ADE || align=right | 5.5 km || 
|-id=591 bgcolor=#E9E9E9
| 193591 ||  || — || January 21, 2001 || Socorro || LINEAR || — || align=right | 2.2 km || 
|-id=592 bgcolor=#C2FFFF
| 193592 ||  || — || January 21, 2001 || Socorro || LINEAR || L4 || align=right | 15 km || 
|-id=593 bgcolor=#E9E9E9
| 193593 ||  || — || January 21, 2001 || Socorro || LINEAR || INO || align=right | 2.3 km || 
|-id=594 bgcolor=#E9E9E9
| 193594 ||  || — || January 21, 2001 || Socorro || LINEAR || — || align=right | 2.3 km || 
|-id=595 bgcolor=#E9E9E9
| 193595 ||  || — || January 19, 2001 || Socorro || LINEAR || RAF || align=right | 1.6 km || 
|-id=596 bgcolor=#E9E9E9
| 193596 ||  || — || January 26, 2001 || Socorro || LINEAR || — || align=right | 3.0 km || 
|-id=597 bgcolor=#E9E9E9
| 193597 ||  || — || January 29, 2001 || Socorro || LINEAR || — || align=right | 2.1 km || 
|-id=598 bgcolor=#E9E9E9
| 193598 ||  || — || January 26, 2001 || Socorro || LINEAR || — || align=right | 1.7 km || 
|-id=599 bgcolor=#E9E9E9
| 193599 ||  || — || January 26, 2001 || Socorro || LINEAR || — || align=right | 3.2 km || 
|-id=600 bgcolor=#E9E9E9
| 193600 ||  || — || January 31, 2001 || Socorro || LINEAR || — || align=right | 4.2 km || 
|}

193601–193700 

|-bgcolor=#E9E9E9
| 193601 ||  || — || January 31, 2001 || Socorro || LINEAR || — || align=right | 2.2 km || 
|-id=602 bgcolor=#C2FFFF
| 193602 ||  || — || January 21, 2001 || Socorro || LINEAR || L4 || align=right | 17 km || 
|-id=603 bgcolor=#E9E9E9
| 193603 ||  || — || January 29, 2001 || Socorro || LINEAR || — || align=right | 2.7 km || 
|-id=604 bgcolor=#E9E9E9
| 193604 ||  || — || January 28, 2001 || Haleakala || NEAT || JUN || align=right | 1.6 km || 
|-id=605 bgcolor=#E9E9E9
| 193605 ||  || — || January 26, 2001 || Socorro || LINEAR || DOR || align=right | 4.8 km || 
|-id=606 bgcolor=#E9E9E9
| 193606 ||  || — || January 24, 2001 || Kitt Peak || Spacewatch || — || align=right | 5.5 km || 
|-id=607 bgcolor=#E9E9E9
| 193607 ||  || — || January 18, 2001 || Socorro || LINEAR || — || align=right | 2.1 km || 
|-id=608 bgcolor=#E9E9E9
| 193608 ||  || — || February 1, 2001 || Socorro || LINEAR || — || align=right | 1.8 km || 
|-id=609 bgcolor=#E9E9E9
| 193609 ||  || — || February 1, 2001 || Socorro || LINEAR || MIT || align=right | 4.5 km || 
|-id=610 bgcolor=#E9E9E9
| 193610 ||  || — || February 1, 2001 || Socorro || LINEAR || — || align=right | 2.2 km || 
|-id=611 bgcolor=#E9E9E9
| 193611 ||  || — || February 1, 2001 || Socorro || LINEAR || — || align=right | 2.8 km || 
|-id=612 bgcolor=#E9E9E9
| 193612 ||  || — || February 1, 2001 || Socorro || LINEAR || — || align=right | 4.4 km || 
|-id=613 bgcolor=#E9E9E9
| 193613 ||  || — || February 1, 2001 || Socorro || LINEAR || — || align=right | 5.8 km || 
|-id=614 bgcolor=#E9E9E9
| 193614 ||  || — || February 1, 2001 || Socorro || LINEAR || DOR || align=right | 3.8 km || 
|-id=615 bgcolor=#E9E9E9
| 193615 ||  || — || February 1, 2001 || Socorro || LINEAR || — || align=right | 4.1 km || 
|-id=616 bgcolor=#E9E9E9
| 193616 ||  || — || February 2, 2001 || Socorro || LINEAR || — || align=right | 3.3 km || 
|-id=617 bgcolor=#E9E9E9
| 193617 ||  || — || February 2, 2001 || Socorro || LINEAR || — || align=right | 2.5 km || 
|-id=618 bgcolor=#E9E9E9
| 193618 ||  || — || February 2, 2001 || Socorro || LINEAR || — || align=right | 3.1 km || 
|-id=619 bgcolor=#E9E9E9
| 193619 ||  || — || February 1, 2001 || Anderson Mesa || LONEOS || — || align=right | 3.7 km || 
|-id=620 bgcolor=#E9E9E9
| 193620 ||  || — || February 1, 2001 || Anderson Mesa || LONEOS || MIS || align=right | 3.4 km || 
|-id=621 bgcolor=#E9E9E9
| 193621 ||  || — || February 1, 2001 || Socorro || LINEAR || — || align=right | 2.8 km || 
|-id=622 bgcolor=#E9E9E9
| 193622 ||  || — || February 1, 2001 || Socorro || LINEAR || ADE || align=right | 4.0 km || 
|-id=623 bgcolor=#E9E9E9
| 193623 ||  || — || February 1, 2001 || Kitt Peak || Spacewatch || — || align=right | 2.6 km || 
|-id=624 bgcolor=#E9E9E9
| 193624 ||  || — || February 1, 2001 || Haleakala || NEAT || JUN || align=right | 3.1 km || 
|-id=625 bgcolor=#E9E9E9
| 193625 ||  || — || February 2, 2001 || Anderson Mesa || LONEOS || — || align=right | 2.4 km || 
|-id=626 bgcolor=#E9E9E9
| 193626 ||  || — || February 5, 2001 || Socorro || LINEAR || BRU || align=right | 5.0 km || 
|-id=627 bgcolor=#E9E9E9
| 193627 ||  || — || February 13, 2001 || Socorro || LINEAR || — || align=right | 3.2 km || 
|-id=628 bgcolor=#E9E9E9
| 193628 ||  || — || February 13, 2001 || Socorro || LINEAR || — || align=right | 1.8 km || 
|-id=629 bgcolor=#E9E9E9
| 193629 ||  || — || February 13, 2001 || Socorro || LINEAR || MIT || align=right | 4.8 km || 
|-id=630 bgcolor=#E9E9E9
| 193630 ||  || — || February 13, 2001 || Socorro || LINEAR || EUN || align=right | 2.3 km || 
|-id=631 bgcolor=#E9E9E9
| 193631 ||  || — || February 14, 2001 || Ondřejov || L. Kotková || — || align=right | 1.2 km || 
|-id=632 bgcolor=#fefefe
| 193632 ||  || — || February 15, 2001 || Socorro || LINEAR || H || align=right | 1.2 km || 
|-id=633 bgcolor=#E9E9E9
| 193633 ||  || — || February 13, 2001 || Socorro || LINEAR || — || align=right | 3.8 km || 
|-id=634 bgcolor=#E9E9E9
| 193634 ||  || — || February 15, 2001 || Socorro || LINEAR || — || align=right | 4.6 km || 
|-id=635 bgcolor=#E9E9E9
| 193635 ||  || — || February 15, 2001 || Socorro || LINEAR || — || align=right | 4.5 km || 
|-id=636 bgcolor=#E9E9E9
| 193636 ||  || — || February 15, 2001 || Socorro || LINEAR || INO || align=right | 1.8 km || 
|-id=637 bgcolor=#E9E9E9
| 193637 ||  || — || February 12, 2001 || Anderson Mesa || LONEOS || — || align=right | 2.3 km || 
|-id=638 bgcolor=#fefefe
| 193638 ||  || — || February 16, 2001 || Socorro || LINEAR || H || align=right | 1.7 km || 
|-id=639 bgcolor=#E9E9E9
| 193639 ||  || — || February 19, 2001 || Oizumi || T. Kobayashi || DOR || align=right | 4.7 km || 
|-id=640 bgcolor=#E9E9E9
| 193640 ||  || — || February 16, 2001 || Socorro || LINEAR || — || align=right | 4.7 km || 
|-id=641 bgcolor=#C2FFFF
| 193641 ||  || — || February 16, 2001 || Socorro || LINEAR || L4 || align=right | 13 km || 
|-id=642 bgcolor=#E9E9E9
| 193642 ||  || — || February 16, 2001 || Socorro || LINEAR || — || align=right | 5.3 km || 
|-id=643 bgcolor=#E9E9E9
| 193643 ||  || — || February 16, 2001 || Socorro || LINEAR || — || align=right | 2.9 km || 
|-id=644 bgcolor=#E9E9E9
| 193644 ||  || — || February 16, 2001 || Socorro || LINEAR || — || align=right | 4.4 km || 
|-id=645 bgcolor=#E9E9E9
| 193645 ||  || — || February 17, 2001 || Socorro || LINEAR || GEF || align=right | 2.0 km || 
|-id=646 bgcolor=#E9E9E9
| 193646 ||  || — || February 17, 2001 || Socorro || LINEAR || — || align=right | 3.5 km || 
|-id=647 bgcolor=#E9E9E9
| 193647 ||  || — || February 17, 2001 || Socorro || LINEAR || — || align=right | 2.8 km || 
|-id=648 bgcolor=#E9E9E9
| 193648 ||  || — || February 17, 2001 || Socorro || LINEAR || — || align=right | 2.6 km || 
|-id=649 bgcolor=#E9E9E9
| 193649 ||  || — || February 19, 2001 || Socorro || LINEAR || — || align=right | 3.4 km || 
|-id=650 bgcolor=#E9E9E9
| 193650 ||  || — || February 19, 2001 || Socorro || LINEAR || — || align=right | 2.6 km || 
|-id=651 bgcolor=#d6d6d6
| 193651 ||  || — || February 19, 2001 || Socorro || LINEAR || — || align=right | 5.4 km || 
|-id=652 bgcolor=#E9E9E9
| 193652 ||  || — || February 19, 2001 || Socorro || LINEAR || — || align=right | 2.7 km || 
|-id=653 bgcolor=#d6d6d6
| 193653 ||  || — || February 19, 2001 || Socorro || LINEAR || — || align=right | 4.1 km || 
|-id=654 bgcolor=#E9E9E9
| 193654 ||  || — || February 19, 2001 || Socorro || LINEAR || — || align=right | 2.2 km || 
|-id=655 bgcolor=#E9E9E9
| 193655 ||  || — || February 19, 2001 || Socorro || LINEAR || — || align=right | 3.1 km || 
|-id=656 bgcolor=#E9E9E9
| 193656 ||  || — || February 19, 2001 || Socorro || LINEAR || MIS || align=right | 3.8 km || 
|-id=657 bgcolor=#E9E9E9
| 193657 ||  || — || February 16, 2001 || Socorro || LINEAR || — || align=right | 2.1 km || 
|-id=658 bgcolor=#E9E9E9
| 193658 ||  || — || February 16, 2001 || Socorro || LINEAR || — || align=right | 4.5 km || 
|-id=659 bgcolor=#E9E9E9
| 193659 ||  || — || February 20, 2001 || Črni Vrh || Črni Vrh || — || align=right | 2.2 km || 
|-id=660 bgcolor=#d6d6d6
| 193660 ||  || — || February 16, 2001 || Kitt Peak || Spacewatch || KOR || align=right | 1.6 km || 
|-id=661 bgcolor=#E9E9E9
| 193661 ||  || — || February 16, 2001 || Kitt Peak || Spacewatch || AGN || align=right | 2.0 km || 
|-id=662 bgcolor=#E9E9E9
| 193662 ||  || — || February 19, 2001 || Socorro || LINEAR || — || align=right | 1.7 km || 
|-id=663 bgcolor=#E9E9E9
| 193663 ||  || — || February 19, 2001 || Socorro || LINEAR || DOR || align=right | 3.1 km || 
|-id=664 bgcolor=#E9E9E9
| 193664 ||  || — || February 19, 2001 || Socorro || LINEAR || MIS || align=right | 3.1 km || 
|-id=665 bgcolor=#E9E9E9
| 193665 ||  || — || February 19, 2001 || Socorro || LINEAR || — || align=right | 4.4 km || 
|-id=666 bgcolor=#E9E9E9
| 193666 ||  || — || February 19, 2001 || Socorro || LINEAR || — || align=right | 2.1 km || 
|-id=667 bgcolor=#E9E9E9
| 193667 ||  || — || February 19, 2001 || Socorro || LINEAR || — || align=right | 2.7 km || 
|-id=668 bgcolor=#E9E9E9
| 193668 ||  || — || February 19, 2001 || Socorro || LINEAR || — || align=right | 4.0 km || 
|-id=669 bgcolor=#E9E9E9
| 193669 ||  || — || February 19, 2001 || Socorro || LINEAR || AGN || align=right | 2.0 km || 
|-id=670 bgcolor=#C2FFFF
| 193670 ||  || — || February 22, 2001 || Kitt Peak || Spacewatch || L4 || align=right | 11 km || 
|-id=671 bgcolor=#d6d6d6
| 193671 ||  || — || February 23, 2001 || Cerro Tololo || DLS || HYG || align=right | 2.5 km || 
|-id=672 bgcolor=#d6d6d6
| 193672 ||  || — || February 21, 2001 || Haleakala || NEAT || — || align=right | 3.4 km || 
|-id=673 bgcolor=#E9E9E9
| 193673 ||  || — || February 17, 2001 || Socorro || LINEAR || — || align=right | 1.7 km || 
|-id=674 bgcolor=#E9E9E9
| 193674 ||  || — || February 17, 2001 || Haleakala || NEAT || CLO || align=right | 3.8 km || 
|-id=675 bgcolor=#E9E9E9
| 193675 ||  || — || February 17, 2001 || Haleakala || NEAT || — || align=right | 2.2 km || 
|-id=676 bgcolor=#E9E9E9
| 193676 ||  || — || February 16, 2001 || Socorro || LINEAR || — || align=right | 3.6 km || 
|-id=677 bgcolor=#E9E9E9
| 193677 ||  || — || February 16, 2001 || Anderson Mesa || LONEOS || — || align=right | 4.6 km || 
|-id=678 bgcolor=#E9E9E9
| 193678 ||  || — || February 16, 2001 || Anderson Mesa || LONEOS || ADE || align=right | 3.4 km || 
|-id=679 bgcolor=#E9E9E9
| 193679 ||  || — || March 1, 2001 || Socorro || LINEAR || — || align=right | 2.0 km || 
|-id=680 bgcolor=#E9E9E9
| 193680 ||  || — || March 1, 2001 || Socorro || LINEAR || ADE || align=right | 4.6 km || 
|-id=681 bgcolor=#E9E9E9
| 193681 ||  || — || March 2, 2001 || Anderson Mesa || LONEOS || — || align=right | 2.8 km || 
|-id=682 bgcolor=#d6d6d6
| 193682 ||  || — || March 15, 2001 || Socorro || LINEAR || — || align=right | 8.5 km || 
|-id=683 bgcolor=#E9E9E9
| 193683 ||  || — || March 15, 2001 || Socorro || LINEAR || — || align=right | 4.4 km || 
|-id=684 bgcolor=#E9E9E9
| 193684 ||  || — || March 14, 2001 || Socorro || LINEAR || BRU || align=right | 6.1 km || 
|-id=685 bgcolor=#E9E9E9
| 193685 ||  || — || March 15, 2001 || Haleakala || NEAT || — || align=right | 1.6 km || 
|-id=686 bgcolor=#E9E9E9
| 193686 ||  || — || March 15, 2001 || Haleakala || NEAT || — || align=right | 3.0 km || 
|-id=687 bgcolor=#d6d6d6
| 193687 ||  || — || March 2, 2001 || Anderson Mesa || LONEOS || — || align=right | 2.7 km || 
|-id=688 bgcolor=#E9E9E9
| 193688 ||  || — || March 18, 2001 || Socorro || LINEAR || — || align=right | 3.3 km || 
|-id=689 bgcolor=#E9E9E9
| 193689 ||  || — || March 19, 2001 || Kitt Peak || Spacewatch || — || align=right | 3.1 km || 
|-id=690 bgcolor=#E9E9E9
| 193690 ||  || — || March 19, 2001 || Anderson Mesa || LONEOS || — || align=right | 3.1 km || 
|-id=691 bgcolor=#d6d6d6
| 193691 ||  || — || March 19, 2001 || Anderson Mesa || LONEOS || — || align=right | 4.7 km || 
|-id=692 bgcolor=#d6d6d6
| 193692 ||  || — || March 19, 2001 || Anderson Mesa || LONEOS || KOR || align=right | 3.0 km || 
|-id=693 bgcolor=#E9E9E9
| 193693 ||  || — || March 18, 2001 || Socorro || LINEAR || — || align=right | 4.0 km || 
|-id=694 bgcolor=#d6d6d6
| 193694 ||  || — || March 18, 2001 || Socorro || LINEAR || — || align=right | 6.1 km || 
|-id=695 bgcolor=#E9E9E9
| 193695 ||  || — || March 19, 2001 || Haleakala || NEAT || — || align=right | 4.7 km || 
|-id=696 bgcolor=#d6d6d6
| 193696 ||  || — || March 18, 2001 || Socorro || LINEAR || — || align=right | 4.3 km || 
|-id=697 bgcolor=#E9E9E9
| 193697 ||  || — || March 18, 2001 || Socorro || LINEAR || — || align=right | 2.1 km || 
|-id=698 bgcolor=#E9E9E9
| 193698 ||  || — || March 18, 2001 || Socorro || LINEAR || INO || align=right | 2.5 km || 
|-id=699 bgcolor=#E9E9E9
| 193699 ||  || — || March 18, 2001 || Socorro || LINEAR || — || align=right | 2.5 km || 
|-id=700 bgcolor=#E9E9E9
| 193700 ||  || — || March 21, 2001 || Socorro || LINEAR || — || align=right | 2.2 km || 
|}

193701–193800 

|-bgcolor=#fefefe
| 193701 ||  || — || March 19, 2001 || Socorro || LINEAR || — || align=right | 1.2 km || 
|-id=702 bgcolor=#E9E9E9
| 193702 ||  || — || March 19, 2001 || Socorro || LINEAR || — || align=right | 1.6 km || 
|-id=703 bgcolor=#d6d6d6
| 193703 ||  || — || March 19, 2001 || Socorro || LINEAR || KOR || align=right | 3.3 km || 
|-id=704 bgcolor=#d6d6d6
| 193704 ||  || — || March 19, 2001 || Socorro || LINEAR || — || align=right | 4.8 km || 
|-id=705 bgcolor=#d6d6d6
| 193705 ||  || — || March 19, 2001 || Socorro || LINEAR || EOS || align=right | 3.2 km || 
|-id=706 bgcolor=#d6d6d6
| 193706 ||  || — || March 19, 2001 || Socorro || LINEAR || — || align=right | 7.0 km || 
|-id=707 bgcolor=#d6d6d6
| 193707 ||  || — || March 21, 2001 || Socorro || LINEAR || — || align=right | 4.7 km || 
|-id=708 bgcolor=#E9E9E9
| 193708 ||  || — || March 21, 2001 || Socorro || LINEAR || — || align=right | 3.0 km || 
|-id=709 bgcolor=#E9E9E9
| 193709 ||  || — || March 23, 2001 || Socorro || LINEAR || — || align=right | 3.5 km || 
|-id=710 bgcolor=#d6d6d6
| 193710 ||  || — || March 23, 2001 || Socorro || LINEAR || — || align=right | 5.3 km || 
|-id=711 bgcolor=#d6d6d6
| 193711 ||  || — || March 24, 2001 || Socorro || LINEAR || — || align=right | 4.5 km || 
|-id=712 bgcolor=#d6d6d6
| 193712 ||  || — || March 26, 2001 || Kitt Peak || Spacewatch || — || align=right | 4.0 km || 
|-id=713 bgcolor=#d6d6d6
| 193713 ||  || — || March 21, 2001 || Anderson Mesa || LONEOS || — || align=right | 5.2 km || 
|-id=714 bgcolor=#d6d6d6
| 193714 ||  || — || March 27, 2001 || Kitt Peak || Spacewatch || — || align=right | 3.1 km || 
|-id=715 bgcolor=#E9E9E9
| 193715 ||  || — || March 16, 2001 || Kitt Peak || Spacewatch || — || align=right | 3.8 km || 
|-id=716 bgcolor=#d6d6d6
| 193716 ||  || — || March 17, 2001 || Socorro || LINEAR || EUP || align=right | 6.9 km || 
|-id=717 bgcolor=#E9E9E9
| 193717 ||  || — || March 17, 2001 || Eskridge || Farpoint Obs. || DOR || align=right | 3.9 km || 
|-id=718 bgcolor=#E9E9E9
| 193718 ||  || — || March 18, 2001 || Anderson Mesa || LONEOS || — || align=right | 2.9 km || 
|-id=719 bgcolor=#E9E9E9
| 193719 ||  || — || March 18, 2001 || Anderson Mesa || LONEOS || — || align=right | 1.9 km || 
|-id=720 bgcolor=#E9E9E9
| 193720 ||  || — || March 18, 2001 || Anderson Mesa || LONEOS || — || align=right | 4.4 km || 
|-id=721 bgcolor=#E9E9E9
| 193721 ||  || — || March 18, 2001 || Anderson Mesa || LONEOS || — || align=right | 4.2 km || 
|-id=722 bgcolor=#d6d6d6
| 193722 ||  || — || March 18, 2001 || Socorro || LINEAR || EOS || align=right | 2.8 km || 
|-id=723 bgcolor=#d6d6d6
| 193723 ||  || — || March 18, 2001 || Haleakala || NEAT || — || align=right | 3.7 km || 
|-id=724 bgcolor=#d6d6d6
| 193724 ||  || — || March 19, 2001 || Anderson Mesa || LONEOS || — || align=right | 3.9 km || 
|-id=725 bgcolor=#E9E9E9
| 193725 ||  || — || March 19, 2001 || Anderson Mesa || LONEOS || GEF || align=right | 2.2 km || 
|-id=726 bgcolor=#d6d6d6
| 193726 ||  || — || March 21, 2001 || Kitt Peak || Spacewatch || — || align=right | 4.9 km || 
|-id=727 bgcolor=#fefefe
| 193727 ||  || — || March 21, 2001 || Kitt Peak || Spacewatch || — || align=right data-sort-value="0.95" | 950 m || 
|-id=728 bgcolor=#d6d6d6
| 193728 ||  || — || March 24, 2001 || Socorro || LINEAR || — || align=right | 2.3 km || 
|-id=729 bgcolor=#E9E9E9
| 193729 ||  || — || March 26, 2001 || Socorro || LINEAR || — || align=right | 4.8 km || 
|-id=730 bgcolor=#E9E9E9
| 193730 ||  || — || March 26, 2001 || Haleakala || NEAT || — || align=right | 3.7 km || 
|-id=731 bgcolor=#E9E9E9
| 193731 ||  || — || March 18, 2001 || Socorro || LINEAR || — || align=right | 3.7 km || 
|-id=732 bgcolor=#d6d6d6
| 193732 ||  || — || March 21, 2001 || Kitt Peak || Spacewatch || THM || align=right | 3.1 km || 
|-id=733 bgcolor=#d6d6d6
| 193733 ||  || — || March 24, 2001 || Kitt Peak || Spacewatch || — || align=right | 4.1 km || 
|-id=734 bgcolor=#E9E9E9
| 193734 ||  || — || March 20, 2001 || Anderson Mesa || LONEOS || — || align=right | 4.3 km || 
|-id=735 bgcolor=#E9E9E9
| 193735 ||  || — || March 20, 2001 || Anderson Mesa || LONEOS || — || align=right | 2.4 km || 
|-id=736 bgcolor=#d6d6d6
| 193736 Henrythroop ||  ||  || March 25, 2001 || Kitt Peak || M. W. Buie || — || align=right | 3.4 km || 
|-id=737 bgcolor=#d6d6d6
| 193737 ||  || — || March 16, 2001 || Socorro || LINEAR || — || align=right | 6.1 km || 
|-id=738 bgcolor=#d6d6d6
| 193738 ||  || — || March 18, 2001 || Anderson Mesa || LONEOS || — || align=right | 3.2 km || 
|-id=739 bgcolor=#d6d6d6
| 193739 ||  || — || March 20, 2001 || Kitt Peak || Spacewatch || KOR || align=right | 1.7 km || 
|-id=740 bgcolor=#E9E9E9
| 193740 ||  || — || March 16, 2001 || Socorro || LINEAR || — || align=right | 2.3 km || 
|-id=741 bgcolor=#d6d6d6
| 193741 ||  || — || April 26, 2001 || Kitt Peak || Spacewatch || — || align=right | 3.7 km || 
|-id=742 bgcolor=#d6d6d6
| 193742 ||  || — || April 27, 2001 || Socorro || LINEAR || — || align=right | 4.8 km || 
|-id=743 bgcolor=#d6d6d6
| 193743 ||  || — || April 24, 2001 || Anderson Mesa || LONEOS || — || align=right | 6.5 km || 
|-id=744 bgcolor=#d6d6d6
| 193744 ||  || — || April 24, 2001 || Haleakala || NEAT || EUP || align=right | 8.7 km || 
|-id=745 bgcolor=#d6d6d6
| 193745 ||  || — || April 17, 2001 || Anderson Mesa || LONEOS || — || align=right | 8.2 km || 
|-id=746 bgcolor=#d6d6d6
| 193746 ||  || — || May 15, 2001 || Anderson Mesa || LONEOS || — || align=right | 5.5 km || 
|-id=747 bgcolor=#d6d6d6
| 193747 ||  || — || May 15, 2001 || Haleakala || NEAT || — || align=right | 4.6 km || 
|-id=748 bgcolor=#d6d6d6
| 193748 ||  || — || May 15, 2001 || Haleakala || NEAT || VER || align=right | 6.3 km || 
|-id=749 bgcolor=#FA8072
| 193749 || 2001 KG || — || May 17, 2001 || Socorro || LINEAR || — || align=right | 1.5 km || 
|-id=750 bgcolor=#d6d6d6
| 193750 ||  || — || May 17, 2001 || Socorro || LINEAR || — || align=right | 5.4 km || 
|-id=751 bgcolor=#d6d6d6
| 193751 ||  || — || May 18, 2001 || Socorro || LINEAR || — || align=right | 5.2 km || 
|-id=752 bgcolor=#fefefe
| 193752 ||  || — || May 18, 2001 || Socorro || LINEAR || — || align=right | 1.3 km || 
|-id=753 bgcolor=#d6d6d6
| 193753 ||  || — || May 17, 2001 || Socorro || LINEAR || 637 || align=right | 4.2 km || 
|-id=754 bgcolor=#fefefe
| 193754 ||  || — || May 22, 2001 || Socorro || LINEAR || FLO || align=right data-sort-value="0.96" | 960 m || 
|-id=755 bgcolor=#d6d6d6
| 193755 ||  || — || May 23, 2001 || Socorro || LINEAR || — || align=right | 8.4 km || 
|-id=756 bgcolor=#d6d6d6
| 193756 ||  || — || May 21, 2001 || Socorro || LINEAR || MEL || align=right | 6.4 km || 
|-id=757 bgcolor=#fefefe
| 193757 ||  || — || May 17, 2001 || Kitt Peak || Spacewatch || — || align=right data-sort-value="0.91" | 910 m || 
|-id=758 bgcolor=#d6d6d6
| 193758 ||  || — || May 23, 2001 || Socorro || LINEAR || — || align=right | 5.3 km || 
|-id=759 bgcolor=#d6d6d6
| 193759 ||  || — || May 24, 2001 || Socorro || LINEAR || — || align=right | 7.3 km || 
|-id=760 bgcolor=#d6d6d6
| 193760 ||  || — || May 25, 2001 || Kitt Peak || Spacewatch || LIX || align=right | 6.2 km || 
|-id=761 bgcolor=#d6d6d6
| 193761 ||  || — || May 25, 2001 || Kitt Peak || Spacewatch || EOS || align=right | 2.8 km || 
|-id=762 bgcolor=#d6d6d6
| 193762 ||  || — || May 26, 2001 || Socorro || LINEAR || — || align=right | 5.2 km || 
|-id=763 bgcolor=#d6d6d6
| 193763 ||  || — || June 15, 2001 || Socorro || LINEAR || ALA || align=right | 7.2 km || 
|-id=764 bgcolor=#FA8072
| 193764 ||  || — || June 15, 2001 || Socorro || LINEAR || — || align=right | 1.1 km || 
|-id=765 bgcolor=#d6d6d6
| 193765 || 2001 MQ || — || June 17, 2001 || Palomar || NEAT || — || align=right | 7.7 km || 
|-id=766 bgcolor=#fefefe
| 193766 ||  || — || June 18, 2001 || Wise || Wise Obs. || — || align=right | 1.8 km || 
|-id=767 bgcolor=#fefefe
| 193767 ||  || — || June 23, 2001 || Palomar || NEAT || — || align=right | 1.4 km || 
|-id=768 bgcolor=#fefefe
| 193768 ||  || — || June 27, 2001 || Palomar || NEAT || FLO || align=right data-sort-value="0.84" | 840 m || 
|-id=769 bgcolor=#fefefe
| 193769 ||  || — || June 27, 2001 || Haleakala || NEAT || — || align=right | 1.3 km || 
|-id=770 bgcolor=#fefefe
| 193770 || 2001 NK || — || July 9, 2001 || Needville || Needville Obs. || FLO || align=right data-sort-value="0.89" | 890 m || 
|-id=771 bgcolor=#d6d6d6
| 193771 ||  || — || July 12, 2001 || Palomar || NEAT || — || align=right | 5.6 km || 
|-id=772 bgcolor=#d6d6d6
| 193772 ||  || — || July 13, 2001 || Palomar || NEAT || ALA || align=right | 5.4 km || 
|-id=773 bgcolor=#fefefe
| 193773 || 2001 OX || — || July 17, 2001 || Haleakala || NEAT || — || align=right | 1.3 km || 
|-id=774 bgcolor=#fefefe
| 193774 ||  || — || July 17, 2001 || Anderson Mesa || LONEOS || — || align=right | 1.5 km || 
|-id=775 bgcolor=#fefefe
| 193775 ||  || — || July 17, 2001 || Anderson Mesa || LONEOS || — || align=right | 1.7 km || 
|-id=776 bgcolor=#fefefe
| 193776 ||  || — || July 18, 2001 || Haleakala || NEAT || — || align=right | 1.2 km || 
|-id=777 bgcolor=#fefefe
| 193777 ||  || — || July 18, 2001 || Palomar || NEAT || FLO || align=right data-sort-value="0.88" | 880 m || 
|-id=778 bgcolor=#fefefe
| 193778 ||  || — || July 22, 2001 || Jonathan B. Postel || V. Pozzoli || — || align=right data-sort-value="0.90" | 900 m || 
|-id=779 bgcolor=#fefefe
| 193779 ||  || — || July 17, 2001 || Haleakala || NEAT || FLO || align=right | 1.1 km || 
|-id=780 bgcolor=#fefefe
| 193780 ||  || — || July 16, 2001 || Anderson Mesa || LONEOS || — || align=right | 1.1 km || 
|-id=781 bgcolor=#fefefe
| 193781 ||  || — || July 18, 2001 || Haleakala || NEAT || FLO || align=right data-sort-value="0.93" | 930 m || 
|-id=782 bgcolor=#fefefe
| 193782 ||  || — || July 19, 2001 || Palomar || NEAT || — || align=right | 1.2 km || 
|-id=783 bgcolor=#fefefe
| 193783 ||  || — || July 19, 2001 || Palomar || NEAT || FLO || align=right data-sort-value="0.83" | 830 m || 
|-id=784 bgcolor=#fefefe
| 193784 ||  || — || July 20, 2001 || Palomar || NEAT || — || align=right | 1.1 km || 
|-id=785 bgcolor=#fefefe
| 193785 ||  || — || July 16, 2001 || Anderson Mesa || LONEOS || — || align=right | 1.2 km || 
|-id=786 bgcolor=#fefefe
| 193786 ||  || — || July 16, 2001 || Haleakala || NEAT || — || align=right | 1.2 km || 
|-id=787 bgcolor=#fefefe
| 193787 ||  || — || July 21, 2001 || Palomar || NEAT || — || align=right | 2.0 km || 
|-id=788 bgcolor=#fefefe
| 193788 ||  || — || July 21, 2001 || Palomar || NEAT || PHO || align=right | 1.8 km || 
|-id=789 bgcolor=#fefefe
| 193789 ||  || — || July 21, 2001 || Haleakala || NEAT || — || align=right | 1.1 km || 
|-id=790 bgcolor=#fefefe
| 193790 ||  || — || July 21, 2001 || Anderson Mesa || LONEOS || FLO || align=right | 1.4 km || 
|-id=791 bgcolor=#fefefe
| 193791 ||  || — || July 21, 2001 || Anderson Mesa || LONEOS || — || align=right | 1.5 km || 
|-id=792 bgcolor=#fefefe
| 193792 ||  || — || July 26, 2001 || Palomar || NEAT || FLO || align=right data-sort-value="0.93" | 930 m || 
|-id=793 bgcolor=#fefefe
| 193793 ||  || — || July 27, 2001 || Palomar || NEAT || FLO || align=right data-sort-value="0.70" | 700 m || 
|-id=794 bgcolor=#fefefe
| 193794 ||  || — || July 29, 2001 || Palomar || NEAT || — || align=right | 1.2 km || 
|-id=795 bgcolor=#fefefe
| 193795 ||  || — || July 25, 2001 || Haleakala || NEAT || — || align=right | 1.4 km || 
|-id=796 bgcolor=#fefefe
| 193796 ||  || — || July 30, 2001 || Socorro || LINEAR || FLO || align=right data-sort-value="0.86" | 860 m || 
|-id=797 bgcolor=#fefefe
| 193797 ||  || — || July 29, 2001 || Socorro || LINEAR || — || align=right | 1.7 km || 
|-id=798 bgcolor=#fefefe
| 193798 ||  || — || August 11, 2001 || Palomar || NEAT || — || align=right data-sort-value="0.99" | 990 m || 
|-id=799 bgcolor=#fefefe
| 193799 ||  || — || August 11, 2001 || Haleakala || NEAT || FLO || align=right data-sort-value="0.79" | 790 m || 
|-id=800 bgcolor=#fefefe
| 193800 ||  || — || August 12, 2001 || Palomar || NEAT || — || align=right | 1.4 km || 
|}

193801–193900 

|-bgcolor=#fefefe
| 193801 ||  || — || August 14, 2001 || Emerald Lane || L. Ball || FLO || align=right data-sort-value="0.66" | 660 m || 
|-id=802 bgcolor=#fefefe
| 193802 ||  || — || August 9, 2001 || Palomar || NEAT || — || align=right | 1.0 km || 
|-id=803 bgcolor=#fefefe
| 193803 ||  || — || August 10, 2001 || Palomar || NEAT || — || align=right | 1.4 km || 
|-id=804 bgcolor=#fefefe
| 193804 ||  || — || August 10, 2001 || Palomar || NEAT || — || align=right | 1.4 km || 
|-id=805 bgcolor=#fefefe
| 193805 ||  || — || August 10, 2001 || Haleakala || NEAT || — || align=right | 1.2 km || 
|-id=806 bgcolor=#fefefe
| 193806 ||  || — || August 10, 2001 || Haleakala || NEAT || — || align=right | 1.1 km || 
|-id=807 bgcolor=#fefefe
| 193807 ||  || — || August 10, 2001 || Haleakala || NEAT || KLI || align=right | 3.5 km || 
|-id=808 bgcolor=#fefefe
| 193808 ||  || — || August 11, 2001 || Haleakala || NEAT || FLO || align=right data-sort-value="0.92" | 920 m || 
|-id=809 bgcolor=#fefefe
| 193809 ||  || — || August 11, 2001 || Haleakala || NEAT || — || align=right | 1.7 km || 
|-id=810 bgcolor=#d6d6d6
| 193810 ||  || — || August 11, 2001 || Palomar || NEAT || 7:4 || align=right | 7.7 km || 
|-id=811 bgcolor=#fefefe
| 193811 ||  || — || August 12, 2001 || Palomar || NEAT || — || align=right | 1.3 km || 
|-id=812 bgcolor=#fefefe
| 193812 ||  || — || August 10, 2001 || Palomar || NEAT || — || align=right | 1.1 km || 
|-id=813 bgcolor=#fefefe
| 193813 ||  || — || August 15, 2001 || Haleakala || NEAT || — || align=right | 1.4 km || 
|-id=814 bgcolor=#fefefe
| 193814 ||  || — || August 14, 2001 || Haleakala || NEAT || — || align=right | 1.1 km || 
|-id=815 bgcolor=#fefefe
| 193815 ||  || — || August 14, 2001 || Haleakala || NEAT || FLO || align=right data-sort-value="0.73" | 730 m || 
|-id=816 bgcolor=#fefefe
| 193816 ||  || — || August 12, 2001 || Palomar || NEAT || — || align=right | 2.4 km || 
|-id=817 bgcolor=#fefefe
| 193817 ||  || — || August 13, 2001 || Haleakala || NEAT || — || align=right | 1.4 km || 
|-id=818 bgcolor=#fefefe
| 193818 || 2001 QH || — || August 16, 2001 || San Marcello || L. Tesi, G. Forti || FLO || align=right | 1.1 km || 
|-id=819 bgcolor=#fefefe
| 193819 ||  || — || August 16, 2001 || Socorro || LINEAR || — || align=right | 1.4 km || 
|-id=820 bgcolor=#fefefe
| 193820 ||  || — || August 16, 2001 || Socorro || LINEAR || FLO || align=right data-sort-value="0.69" | 690 m || 
|-id=821 bgcolor=#fefefe
| 193821 ||  || — || August 16, 2001 || Socorro || LINEAR || NYS || align=right data-sort-value="0.74" | 740 m || 
|-id=822 bgcolor=#FA8072
| 193822 ||  || — || August 16, 2001 || Socorro || LINEAR || — || align=right | 1.1 km || 
|-id=823 bgcolor=#fefefe
| 193823 ||  || — || August 16, 2001 || Socorro || LINEAR || — || align=right | 1.3 km || 
|-id=824 bgcolor=#fefefe
| 193824 ||  || — || August 16, 2001 || Socorro || LINEAR || — || align=right | 1.4 km || 
|-id=825 bgcolor=#fefefe
| 193825 ||  || — || August 16, 2001 || Socorro || LINEAR || FLO || align=right | 1.3 km || 
|-id=826 bgcolor=#d6d6d6
| 193826 ||  || — || August 17, 2001 || Socorro || LINEAR || HYG || align=right | 5.2 km || 
|-id=827 bgcolor=#fefefe
| 193827 ||  || — || August 16, 2001 || Socorro || LINEAR || — || align=right | 1.0 km || 
|-id=828 bgcolor=#FA8072
| 193828 ||  || — || August 16, 2001 || Socorro || LINEAR || — || align=right | 1.0 km || 
|-id=829 bgcolor=#fefefe
| 193829 ||  || — || August 16, 2001 || Socorro || LINEAR || — || align=right data-sort-value="0.89" | 890 m || 
|-id=830 bgcolor=#d6d6d6
| 193830 ||  || — || August 16, 2001 || Socorro || LINEAR || — || align=right | 4.4 km || 
|-id=831 bgcolor=#fefefe
| 193831 ||  || — || August 16, 2001 || Socorro || LINEAR || — || align=right | 1.5 km || 
|-id=832 bgcolor=#fefefe
| 193832 ||  || — || August 16, 2001 || Socorro || LINEAR || FLO || align=right data-sort-value="0.87" | 870 m || 
|-id=833 bgcolor=#fefefe
| 193833 ||  || — || August 16, 2001 || Socorro || LINEAR || — || align=right | 1.3 km || 
|-id=834 bgcolor=#fefefe
| 193834 ||  || — || August 16, 2001 || Socorro || LINEAR || FLO || align=right data-sort-value="0.80" | 800 m || 
|-id=835 bgcolor=#fefefe
| 193835 ||  || — || August 16, 2001 || Socorro || LINEAR || — || align=right | 1.0 km || 
|-id=836 bgcolor=#fefefe
| 193836 ||  || — || August 16, 2001 || Socorro || LINEAR || — || align=right | 1.4 km || 
|-id=837 bgcolor=#fefefe
| 193837 ||  || — || August 16, 2001 || Socorro || LINEAR || — || align=right data-sort-value="0.98" | 980 m || 
|-id=838 bgcolor=#fefefe
| 193838 ||  || — || August 16, 2001 || Socorro || LINEAR || FLO || align=right | 1.0 km || 
|-id=839 bgcolor=#fefefe
| 193839 ||  || — || August 16, 2001 || Socorro || LINEAR || — || align=right | 1.4 km || 
|-id=840 bgcolor=#fefefe
| 193840 ||  || — || August 17, 2001 || Socorro || LINEAR || ERI || align=right | 2.2 km || 
|-id=841 bgcolor=#fefefe
| 193841 ||  || — || August 16, 2001 || Socorro || LINEAR || NYS || align=right | 1.3 km || 
|-id=842 bgcolor=#fefefe
| 193842 ||  || — || August 19, 2001 || Socorro || LINEAR || FLO || align=right data-sort-value="0.93" | 930 m || 
|-id=843 bgcolor=#fefefe
| 193843 ||  || — || August 20, 2001 || Palomar || NEAT || PHO || align=right | 1.3 km || 
|-id=844 bgcolor=#fefefe
| 193844 ||  || — || August 17, 2001 || Socorro || LINEAR || — || align=right | 1.5 km || 
|-id=845 bgcolor=#fefefe
| 193845 ||  || — || August 21, 2001 || Palomar || NEAT || FLO || align=right data-sort-value="0.80" | 800 m || 
|-id=846 bgcolor=#FA8072
| 193846 ||  || — || August 20, 2001 || Socorro || LINEAR || — || align=right | 1.6 km || 
|-id=847 bgcolor=#fefefe
| 193847 ||  || — || August 20, 2001 || Palomar || NEAT || — || align=right | 1.3 km || 
|-id=848 bgcolor=#fefefe
| 193848 ||  || — || August 20, 2001 || Haleakala || NEAT || — || align=right data-sort-value="0.96" | 960 m || 
|-id=849 bgcolor=#fefefe
| 193849 ||  || — || August 26, 2001 || Eskridge || Farpoint Obs. || — || align=right | 1.1 km || 
|-id=850 bgcolor=#fefefe
| 193850 ||  || — || August 25, 2001 || Socorro || LINEAR || — || align=right | 1.4 km || 
|-id=851 bgcolor=#fefefe
| 193851 ||  || — || August 17, 2001 || Socorro || LINEAR || — || align=right | 1.3 km || 
|-id=852 bgcolor=#fefefe
| 193852 ||  || — || August 17, 2001 || Socorro || LINEAR || — || align=right | 1.2 km || 
|-id=853 bgcolor=#fefefe
| 193853 ||  || — || August 17, 2001 || Socorro || LINEAR || — || align=right | 1.4 km || 
|-id=854 bgcolor=#fefefe
| 193854 ||  || — || August 17, 2001 || Socorro || LINEAR || V || align=right | 1.2 km || 
|-id=855 bgcolor=#fefefe
| 193855 ||  || — || August 19, 2001 || Socorro || LINEAR || — || align=right | 1.2 km || 
|-id=856 bgcolor=#fefefe
| 193856 ||  || — || August 19, 2001 || Socorro || LINEAR || NYS || align=right data-sort-value="0.92" | 920 m || 
|-id=857 bgcolor=#fefefe
| 193857 ||  || — || August 19, 2001 || Socorro || LINEAR || — || align=right data-sort-value="0.94" | 940 m || 
|-id=858 bgcolor=#fefefe
| 193858 ||  || — || August 20, 2001 || Socorro || LINEAR || FLO || align=right data-sort-value="0.93" | 930 m || 
|-id=859 bgcolor=#fefefe
| 193859 ||  || — || August 20, 2001 || Socorro || LINEAR || FLO || align=right | 1.1 km || 
|-id=860 bgcolor=#fefefe
| 193860 ||  || — || August 21, 2001 || Socorro || LINEAR || — || align=right | 1.3 km || 
|-id=861 bgcolor=#fefefe
| 193861 ||  || — || August 22, 2001 || Socorro || LINEAR || — || align=right | 2.3 km || 
|-id=862 bgcolor=#d6d6d6
| 193862 ||  || — || August 24, 2001 || Socorro || LINEAR || TIR || align=right | 5.5 km || 
|-id=863 bgcolor=#fefefe
| 193863 ||  || — || August 24, 2001 || Socorro || LINEAR || — || align=right | 2.5 km || 
|-id=864 bgcolor=#fefefe
| 193864 ||  || — || August 24, 2001 || Socorro || LINEAR || — || align=right | 1.7 km || 
|-id=865 bgcolor=#fefefe
| 193865 ||  || — || August 24, 2001 || Goodricke-Pigott || R. A. Tucker || V || align=right data-sort-value="0.85" | 850 m || 
|-id=866 bgcolor=#fefefe
| 193866 ||  || — || August 21, 2001 || Kitt Peak || Spacewatch || NYS || align=right data-sort-value="0.92" | 920 m || 
|-id=867 bgcolor=#fefefe
| 193867 ||  || — || August 24, 2001 || Kitt Peak || Spacewatch || — || align=right data-sort-value="0.97" | 970 m || 
|-id=868 bgcolor=#fefefe
| 193868 ||  || — || August 21, 2001 || Haleakala || NEAT || FLO || align=right data-sort-value="0.88" | 880 m || 
|-id=869 bgcolor=#fefefe
| 193869 ||  || — || August 26, 2001 || Desert Eagle || W. K. Y. Yeung || FLO || align=right data-sort-value="0.96" | 960 m || 
|-id=870 bgcolor=#fefefe
| 193870 ||  || — || August 29, 2001 || Ondřejov || M. Wolf, L. Kotková || — || align=right | 1.0 km || 
|-id=871 bgcolor=#fefefe
| 193871 ||  || — || August 23, 2001 || Anderson Mesa || LONEOS || — || align=right | 1.2 km || 
|-id=872 bgcolor=#fefefe
| 193872 ||  || — || August 23, 2001 || Anderson Mesa || LONEOS || FLO || align=right data-sort-value="0.92" | 920 m || 
|-id=873 bgcolor=#fefefe
| 193873 ||  || — || August 23, 2001 || Anderson Mesa || LONEOS || — || align=right | 1.1 km || 
|-id=874 bgcolor=#fefefe
| 193874 ||  || — || August 23, 2001 || Anderson Mesa || LONEOS || — || align=right | 1.1 km || 
|-id=875 bgcolor=#fefefe
| 193875 ||  || — || August 23, 2001 || Anderson Mesa || LONEOS || NYS || align=right | 1.0 km || 
|-id=876 bgcolor=#fefefe
| 193876 ||  || — || August 24, 2001 || Haleakala || NEAT || — || align=right | 1.1 km || 
|-id=877 bgcolor=#fefefe
| 193877 ||  || — || August 26, 2001 || Socorro || LINEAR || V || align=right | 1.1 km || 
|-id=878 bgcolor=#fefefe
| 193878 ||  || — || August 27, 2001 || Palomar || NEAT || — || align=right | 1.4 km || 
|-id=879 bgcolor=#fefefe
| 193879 ||  || — || August 25, 2001 || Palomar || NEAT || — || align=right data-sort-value="0.98" | 980 m || 
|-id=880 bgcolor=#fefefe
| 193880 ||  || — || August 25, 2001 || Palomar || NEAT || NYS || align=right | 1.0 km || 
|-id=881 bgcolor=#fefefe
| 193881 ||  || — || August 26, 2001 || Palomar || NEAT || — || align=right | 1.2 km || 
|-id=882 bgcolor=#fefefe
| 193882 ||  || — || August 17, 2001 || Palomar || NEAT || — || align=right | 3.8 km || 
|-id=883 bgcolor=#fefefe
| 193883 ||  || — || August 27, 2001 || Palomar || NEAT || — || align=right | 3.0 km || 
|-id=884 bgcolor=#fefefe
| 193884 ||  || — || August 21, 2001 || Desert Eagle || W. K. Y. Yeung || — || align=right | 1.5 km || 
|-id=885 bgcolor=#fefefe
| 193885 ||  || — || August 22, 2001 || Kitt Peak || Spacewatch || FLO || align=right data-sort-value="0.84" | 840 m || 
|-id=886 bgcolor=#fefefe
| 193886 ||  || — || August 23, 2001 || Anderson Mesa || LONEOS || — || align=right | 1.0 km || 
|-id=887 bgcolor=#d6d6d6
| 193887 ||  || — || August 23, 2001 || Socorro || LINEAR || — || align=right | 3.1 km || 
|-id=888 bgcolor=#fefefe
| 193888 ||  || — || August 23, 2001 || Anderson Mesa || LONEOS || — || align=right data-sort-value="0.93" | 930 m || 
|-id=889 bgcolor=#fefefe
| 193889 ||  || — || August 23, 2001 || Anderson Mesa || LONEOS || — || align=right data-sort-value="0.96" | 960 m || 
|-id=890 bgcolor=#fefefe
| 193890 ||  || — || August 23, 2001 || Anderson Mesa || LONEOS || — || align=right | 1.3 km || 
|-id=891 bgcolor=#fefefe
| 193891 ||  || — || August 23, 2001 || Anderson Mesa || LONEOS || — || align=right | 1.0 km || 
|-id=892 bgcolor=#fefefe
| 193892 ||  || — || August 23, 2001 || Anderson Mesa || LONEOS || NYS || align=right | 1.0 km || 
|-id=893 bgcolor=#fefefe
| 193893 ||  || — || August 23, 2001 || Anderson Mesa || LONEOS || — || align=right | 1.3 km || 
|-id=894 bgcolor=#fefefe
| 193894 ||  || — || August 24, 2001 || Desert Eagle || W. K. Y. Yeung || — || align=right | 1.2 km || 
|-id=895 bgcolor=#fefefe
| 193895 ||  || — || August 24, 2001 || Anderson Mesa || LONEOS || FLO || align=right | 1.3 km || 
|-id=896 bgcolor=#fefefe
| 193896 ||  || — || August 24, 2001 || Anderson Mesa || LONEOS || FLO || align=right | 1.2 km || 
|-id=897 bgcolor=#d6d6d6
| 193897 ||  || — || August 24, 2001 || Anderson Mesa || LONEOS || LIX || align=right | 7.2 km || 
|-id=898 bgcolor=#fefefe
| 193898 ||  || — || August 24, 2001 || Anderson Mesa || LONEOS || — || align=right | 1.4 km || 
|-id=899 bgcolor=#d6d6d6
| 193899 ||  || — || August 24, 2001 || Anderson Mesa || LONEOS || 7:4 || align=right | 5.3 km || 
|-id=900 bgcolor=#fefefe
| 193900 ||  || — || August 24, 2001 || Socorro || LINEAR || — || align=right | 1.1 km || 
|}

193901–194000 

|-bgcolor=#fefefe
| 193901 ||  || — || August 24, 2001 || Socorro || LINEAR || — || align=right | 2.8 km || 
|-id=902 bgcolor=#fefefe
| 193902 ||  || — || August 24, 2001 || Socorro || LINEAR || — || align=right | 3.2 km || 
|-id=903 bgcolor=#fefefe
| 193903 ||  || — || August 24, 2001 || Socorro || LINEAR || FLO || align=right data-sort-value="0.85" | 850 m || 
|-id=904 bgcolor=#fefefe
| 193904 ||  || — || August 24, 2001 || Socorro || LINEAR || — || align=right | 1.9 km || 
|-id=905 bgcolor=#fefefe
| 193905 ||  || — || August 24, 2001 || Socorro || LINEAR || NYS || align=right | 1.1 km || 
|-id=906 bgcolor=#fefefe
| 193906 ||  || — || August 24, 2001 || Socorro || LINEAR || — || align=right | 1.3 km || 
|-id=907 bgcolor=#fefefe
| 193907 ||  || — || August 24, 2001 || Socorro || LINEAR || — || align=right | 1.1 km || 
|-id=908 bgcolor=#fefefe
| 193908 ||  || — || August 24, 2001 || Socorro || LINEAR || FLO || align=right | 1.2 km || 
|-id=909 bgcolor=#fefefe
| 193909 ||  || — || August 24, 2001 || Socorro || LINEAR || NYS || align=right data-sort-value="0.81" | 810 m || 
|-id=910 bgcolor=#fefefe
| 193910 ||  || — || August 24, 2001 || Haleakala || NEAT || FLO || align=right | 1.0 km || 
|-id=911 bgcolor=#fefefe
| 193911 ||  || — || August 25, 2001 || Socorro || LINEAR || — || align=right | 1.2 km || 
|-id=912 bgcolor=#fefefe
| 193912 ||  || — || August 25, 2001 || Socorro || LINEAR || — || align=right | 1.3 km || 
|-id=913 bgcolor=#fefefe
| 193913 ||  || — || August 25, 2001 || Socorro || LINEAR || V || align=right | 1.1 km || 
|-id=914 bgcolor=#fefefe
| 193914 ||  || — || August 25, 2001 || Socorro || LINEAR || — || align=right | 1.3 km || 
|-id=915 bgcolor=#fefefe
| 193915 ||  || — || August 20, 2001 || Socorro || LINEAR || FLO || align=right data-sort-value="0.91" | 910 m || 
|-id=916 bgcolor=#fefefe
| 193916 ||  || — || August 19, 2001 || Socorro || LINEAR || — || align=right data-sort-value="0.91" | 910 m || 
|-id=917 bgcolor=#fefefe
| 193917 ||  || — || August 19, 2001 || Socorro || LINEAR || — || align=right | 1.3 km || 
|-id=918 bgcolor=#fefefe
| 193918 ||  || — || August 19, 2001 || Socorro || LINEAR || FLO || align=right data-sort-value="0.99" | 990 m || 
|-id=919 bgcolor=#fefefe
| 193919 ||  || — || August 19, 2001 || Socorro || LINEAR || — || align=right | 1.0 km || 
|-id=920 bgcolor=#fefefe
| 193920 ||  || — || August 30, 2001 || Palomar || NEAT || — || align=right | 1.2 km || 
|-id=921 bgcolor=#fefefe
| 193921 ||  || — || August 17, 2001 || Socorro || LINEAR || FLO || align=right | 3.6 km || 
|-id=922 bgcolor=#fefefe
| 193922 ||  || — || August 17, 2001 || Socorro || LINEAR || V || align=right data-sort-value="0.98" | 980 m || 
|-id=923 bgcolor=#fefefe
| 193923 ||  || — || August 16, 2001 || Socorro || LINEAR || — || align=right | 1.4 km || 
|-id=924 bgcolor=#fefefe
| 193924 ||  || — || August 28, 2001 || Bergisch Gladbach || W. Bickel || — || align=right data-sort-value="0.93" | 930 m || 
|-id=925 bgcolor=#fefefe
| 193925 ||  || — || August 25, 2001 || Anderson Mesa || LONEOS || — || align=right | 2.5 km || 
|-id=926 bgcolor=#fefefe
| 193926 ||  || — || September 9, 2001 || Desert Eagle || W. K. Y. Yeung || — || align=right | 1.1 km || 
|-id=927 bgcolor=#fefefe
| 193927 ||  || — || September 9, 2001 || Desert Eagle || W. K. Y. Yeung || — || align=right | 1.1 km || 
|-id=928 bgcolor=#fefefe
| 193928 ||  || — || September 10, 2001 || Socorro || LINEAR || — || align=right | 1.2 km || 
|-id=929 bgcolor=#fefefe
| 193929 ||  || — || September 7, 2001 || Socorro || LINEAR || FLO || align=right data-sort-value="0.85" | 850 m || 
|-id=930 bgcolor=#fefefe
| 193930 ||  || — || September 7, 2001 || Socorro || LINEAR || MAS || align=right data-sort-value="0.91" | 910 m || 
|-id=931 bgcolor=#fefefe
| 193931 ||  || — || September 7, 2001 || Socorro || LINEAR || — || align=right | 1.3 km || 
|-id=932 bgcolor=#fefefe
| 193932 ||  || — || September 7, 2001 || Socorro || LINEAR || V || align=right data-sort-value="0.90" | 900 m || 
|-id=933 bgcolor=#fefefe
| 193933 ||  || — || September 7, 2001 || Socorro || LINEAR || — || align=right | 1.2 km || 
|-id=934 bgcolor=#fefefe
| 193934 ||  || — || September 7, 2001 || Socorro || LINEAR || FLO || align=right | 1.00 km || 
|-id=935 bgcolor=#fefefe
| 193935 ||  || — || September 7, 2001 || Socorro || LINEAR || — || align=right data-sort-value="0.77" | 770 m || 
|-id=936 bgcolor=#fefefe
| 193936 ||  || — || September 7, 2001 || Socorro || LINEAR || — || align=right | 1.0 km || 
|-id=937 bgcolor=#fefefe
| 193937 ||  || — || September 7, 2001 || Socorro || LINEAR || — || align=right data-sort-value="0.81" | 810 m || 
|-id=938 bgcolor=#fefefe
| 193938 ||  || — || September 7, 2001 || Socorro || LINEAR || NYS || align=right | 2.5 km || 
|-id=939 bgcolor=#fefefe
| 193939 ||  || — || September 8, 2001 || Socorro || LINEAR || V || align=right data-sort-value="0.82" | 820 m || 
|-id=940 bgcolor=#fefefe
| 193940 ||  || — || September 8, 2001 || Socorro || LINEAR || FLO || align=right data-sort-value="0.63" | 630 m || 
|-id=941 bgcolor=#fefefe
| 193941 ||  || — || September 8, 2001 || Socorro || LINEAR || FLO || align=right | 1.0 km || 
|-id=942 bgcolor=#fefefe
| 193942 ||  || — || September 8, 2001 || Socorro || LINEAR || — || align=right | 1.2 km || 
|-id=943 bgcolor=#d6d6d6
| 193943 ||  || — || September 8, 2001 || Socorro || LINEAR || — || align=right | 5.5 km || 
|-id=944 bgcolor=#fefefe
| 193944 ||  || — || September 9, 2001 || Socorro || LINEAR || — || align=right | 1.1 km || 
|-id=945 bgcolor=#fefefe
| 193945 ||  || — || September 11, 2001 || Socorro || LINEAR || — || align=right data-sort-value="0.94" | 940 m || 
|-id=946 bgcolor=#fefefe
| 193946 ||  || — || September 11, 2001 || Oakley || Oakley Obs. || — || align=right data-sort-value="0.91" | 910 m || 
|-id=947 bgcolor=#fefefe
| 193947 ||  || — || September 15, 2001 || Emerald Lane || L. Ball || NYS || align=right | 1.0 km || 
|-id=948 bgcolor=#FA8072
| 193948 ||  || — || September 12, 2001 || Socorro || LINEAR || — || align=right | 1.7 km || 
|-id=949 bgcolor=#fefefe
| 193949 ||  || — || September 12, 2001 || Socorro || LINEAR || — || align=right | 1.2 km || 
|-id=950 bgcolor=#fefefe
| 193950 ||  || — || September 12, 2001 || Socorro || LINEAR || — || align=right data-sort-value="0.94" | 940 m || 
|-id=951 bgcolor=#d6d6d6
| 193951 ||  || — || September 12, 2001 || Socorro || LINEAR || — || align=right | 4.7 km || 
|-id=952 bgcolor=#fefefe
| 193952 ||  || — || September 12, 2001 || Socorro || LINEAR || FLO || align=right data-sort-value="0.83" | 830 m || 
|-id=953 bgcolor=#fefefe
| 193953 ||  || — || September 10, 2001 || Socorro || LINEAR || — || align=right | 1.5 km || 
|-id=954 bgcolor=#fefefe
| 193954 ||  || — || September 10, 2001 || Socorro || LINEAR || — || align=right | 1.2 km || 
|-id=955 bgcolor=#fefefe
| 193955 ||  || — || September 10, 2001 || Socorro || LINEAR || FLO || align=right | 1.0 km || 
|-id=956 bgcolor=#fefefe
| 193956 ||  || — || September 10, 2001 || Socorro || LINEAR || — || align=right | 1.5 km || 
|-id=957 bgcolor=#fefefe
| 193957 ||  || — || September 10, 2001 || Socorro || LINEAR || V || align=right | 1.1 km || 
|-id=958 bgcolor=#fefefe
| 193958 ||  || — || September 10, 2001 || Socorro || LINEAR || — || align=right | 1.5 km || 
|-id=959 bgcolor=#fefefe
| 193959 ||  || — || September 13, 2001 || Palomar || NEAT || — || align=right | 1.1 km || 
|-id=960 bgcolor=#fefefe
| 193960 ||  || — || September 14, 2001 || Palomar || NEAT || — || align=right | 1.5 km || 
|-id=961 bgcolor=#fefefe
| 193961 ||  || — || September 11, 2001 || Anderson Mesa || LONEOS || FLO || align=right | 1.2 km || 
|-id=962 bgcolor=#fefefe
| 193962 ||  || — || September 11, 2001 || Anderson Mesa || LONEOS || — || align=right data-sort-value="0.94" | 940 m || 
|-id=963 bgcolor=#fefefe
| 193963 ||  || — || September 11, 2001 || Anderson Mesa || LONEOS || — || align=right | 1.2 km || 
|-id=964 bgcolor=#fefefe
| 193964 ||  || — || September 11, 2001 || Anderson Mesa || LONEOS || — || align=right data-sort-value="0.87" | 870 m || 
|-id=965 bgcolor=#fefefe
| 193965 ||  || — || September 11, 2001 || Anderson Mesa || LONEOS || FLO || align=right data-sort-value="0.84" | 840 m || 
|-id=966 bgcolor=#fefefe
| 193966 ||  || — || September 11, 2001 || Anderson Mesa || LONEOS || — || align=right | 1.1 km || 
|-id=967 bgcolor=#fefefe
| 193967 ||  || — || September 11, 2001 || Anderson Mesa || LONEOS || FLO || align=right data-sort-value="0.96" | 960 m || 
|-id=968 bgcolor=#fefefe
| 193968 ||  || — || September 11, 2001 || Anderson Mesa || LONEOS || — || align=right | 1.3 km || 
|-id=969 bgcolor=#fefefe
| 193969 ||  || — || September 11, 2001 || Anderson Mesa || LONEOS || V || align=right | 1.3 km || 
|-id=970 bgcolor=#fefefe
| 193970 ||  || — || September 12, 2001 || Socorro || LINEAR || — || align=right | 1.0 km || 
|-id=971 bgcolor=#fefefe
| 193971 ||  || — || September 12, 2001 || Socorro || LINEAR || — || align=right | 1.0 km || 
|-id=972 bgcolor=#fefefe
| 193972 ||  || — || September 12, 2001 || Socorro || LINEAR || — || align=right | 1.1 km || 
|-id=973 bgcolor=#fefefe
| 193973 ||  || — || September 12, 2001 || Socorro || LINEAR || — || align=right data-sort-value="0.86" | 860 m || 
|-id=974 bgcolor=#fefefe
| 193974 ||  || — || September 12, 2001 || Socorro || LINEAR || — || align=right | 1.1 km || 
|-id=975 bgcolor=#fefefe
| 193975 ||  || — || September 12, 2001 || Socorro || LINEAR || — || align=right data-sort-value="0.79" | 790 m || 
|-id=976 bgcolor=#fefefe
| 193976 ||  || — || September 12, 2001 || Socorro || LINEAR || FLO || align=right | 1.1 km || 
|-id=977 bgcolor=#fefefe
| 193977 ||  || — || September 12, 2001 || Socorro || LINEAR || V || align=right | 1.1 km || 
|-id=978 bgcolor=#fefefe
| 193978 ||  || — || September 12, 2001 || Socorro || LINEAR || — || align=right | 1.0 km || 
|-id=979 bgcolor=#fefefe
| 193979 ||  || — || September 12, 2001 || Socorro || LINEAR || — || align=right | 1.1 km || 
|-id=980 bgcolor=#fefefe
| 193980 ||  || — || September 12, 2001 || Socorro || LINEAR || — || align=right | 1.3 km || 
|-id=981 bgcolor=#fefefe
| 193981 ||  || — || September 12, 2001 || Socorro || LINEAR || — || align=right | 1.1 km || 
|-id=982 bgcolor=#fefefe
| 193982 ||  || — || September 12, 2001 || Socorro || LINEAR || — || align=right data-sort-value="0.98" | 980 m || 
|-id=983 bgcolor=#fefefe
| 193983 ||  || — || September 12, 2001 || Socorro || LINEAR || — || align=right | 1.0 km || 
|-id=984 bgcolor=#fefefe
| 193984 ||  || — || September 12, 2001 || Socorro || LINEAR || — || align=right | 1.2 km || 
|-id=985 bgcolor=#d6d6d6
| 193985 ||  || — || September 12, 2001 || Socorro || LINEAR || — || align=right | 5.2 km || 
|-id=986 bgcolor=#fefefe
| 193986 ||  || — || September 12, 2001 || Socorro || LINEAR || — || align=right | 1.5 km || 
|-id=987 bgcolor=#fefefe
| 193987 ||  || — || September 12, 2001 || Socorro || LINEAR || FLO || align=right data-sort-value="0.95" | 950 m || 
|-id=988 bgcolor=#fefefe
| 193988 ||  || — || September 12, 2001 || Socorro || LINEAR || FLO || align=right | 1.1 km || 
|-id=989 bgcolor=#fefefe
| 193989 ||  || — || September 12, 2001 || Socorro || LINEAR || FLO || align=right data-sort-value="0.94" | 940 m || 
|-id=990 bgcolor=#fefefe
| 193990 ||  || — || September 9, 2001 || Haleakala || NEAT || — || align=right | 1.3 km || 
|-id=991 bgcolor=#fefefe
| 193991 ||  || — || September 10, 2001 || Anderson Mesa || LONEOS || — || align=right | 1.4 km || 
|-id=992 bgcolor=#fefefe
| 193992 ||  || — || September 10, 2001 || Socorro || LINEAR || — || align=right | 1.4 km || 
|-id=993 bgcolor=#fefefe
| 193993 ||  || — || September 11, 2001 || Anderson Mesa || LONEOS || V || align=right | 1.1 km || 
|-id=994 bgcolor=#fefefe
| 193994 ||  || — || September 11, 2001 || Anderson Mesa || LONEOS || FLO || align=right data-sort-value="0.91" | 910 m || 
|-id=995 bgcolor=#fefefe
| 193995 ||  || — || September 11, 2001 || Anderson Mesa || LONEOS || V || align=right data-sort-value="0.89" | 890 m || 
|-id=996 bgcolor=#fefefe
| 193996 ||  || — || September 11, 2001 || Anderson Mesa || LONEOS || — || align=right | 1.4 km || 
|-id=997 bgcolor=#fefefe
| 193997 ||  || — || September 11, 2001 || Anderson Mesa || LONEOS || — || align=right data-sort-value="0.91" | 910 m || 
|-id=998 bgcolor=#fefefe
| 193998 ||  || — || September 11, 2001 || Anderson Mesa || LONEOS || FLO || align=right | 1.1 km || 
|-id=999 bgcolor=#d6d6d6
| 193999 ||  || — || September 13, 2001 || Nashville || R. Clingan || — || align=right | 6.2 km || 
|-id=000 bgcolor=#d6d6d6
| 194000 ||  || — || September 15, 2001 || Palomar || NEAT || — || align=right | 7.4 km || 
|}

References

External links 
 Discovery Circumstances: Numbered Minor Planets (190001)–(195000) (IAU Minor Planet Center)

0193